

479001–479100 

|-bgcolor=#E9E9E9
| 479001 ||  || — || September 25, 2012 || Mount Lemmon || Mount Lemmon Survey || — || align=right data-sort-value="0.94" | 940 m || 
|-id=002 bgcolor=#E9E9E9
| 479002 ||  || — || February 26, 2010 || WISE || WISE || — || align=right | 2.4 km || 
|-id=003 bgcolor=#E9E9E9
| 479003 ||  || — || October 19, 2003 || Kitt Peak || Spacewatch || — || align=right | 1.3 km || 
|-id=004 bgcolor=#E9E9E9
| 479004 ||  || — || January 15, 2009 || XuYi || PMO NEO || — || align=right data-sort-value="0.77" | 770 m || 
|-id=005 bgcolor=#d6d6d6
| 479005 ||  || — || October 17, 2006 || Kitt Peak || Spacewatch || — || align=right | 3.4 km || 
|-id=006 bgcolor=#E9E9E9
| 479006 ||  || — || May 9, 2011 || Mount Lemmon || Mount Lemmon Survey || — || align=right | 1.1 km || 
|-id=007 bgcolor=#E9E9E9
| 479007 ||  || — || November 8, 2008 || Mount Lemmon || Mount Lemmon Survey || — || align=right | 1.1 km || 
|-id=008 bgcolor=#E9E9E9
| 479008 ||  || — || January 1, 2009 || Mount Lemmon || Mount Lemmon Survey || — || align=right | 1.3 km || 
|-id=009 bgcolor=#E9E9E9
| 479009 ||  || — || April 14, 2010 || WISE || WISE || — || align=right | 2.2 km || 
|-id=010 bgcolor=#E9E9E9
| 479010 ||  || — || December 3, 2012 || Mount Lemmon || Mount Lemmon Survey || — || align=right | 2.2 km || 
|-id=011 bgcolor=#E9E9E9
| 479011 ||  || — || February 18, 2010 || WISE || WISE || — || align=right | 3.1 km || 
|-id=012 bgcolor=#d6d6d6
| 479012 ||  || — || November 13, 2012 || Mount Lemmon || Mount Lemmon Survey || — || align=right | 2.9 km || 
|-id=013 bgcolor=#E9E9E9
| 479013 ||  || — || December 22, 2003 || Socorro || LINEAR || — || align=right | 2.6 km || 
|-id=014 bgcolor=#d6d6d6
| 479014 ||  || — || December 19, 2001 || Socorro || LINEAR || — || align=right | 3.6 km || 
|-id=015 bgcolor=#d6d6d6
| 479015 ||  || — || November 25, 2006 || Kitt Peak || Spacewatch || TIR || align=right | 3.0 km || 
|-id=016 bgcolor=#E9E9E9
| 479016 ||  || — || January 6, 2005 || Catalina || CSS || — || align=right | 1.2 km || 
|-id=017 bgcolor=#d6d6d6
| 479017 ||  || — || December 12, 2012 || Mount Lemmon || Mount Lemmon Survey || — || align=right | 3.1 km || 
|-id=018 bgcolor=#d6d6d6
| 479018 ||  || — || November 12, 2012 || Mount Lemmon || Mount Lemmon Survey || — || align=right | 2.8 km || 
|-id=019 bgcolor=#E9E9E9
| 479019 ||  || — || August 14, 2007 || Siding Spring || SSS || — || align=right | 1.8 km || 
|-id=020 bgcolor=#E9E9E9
| 479020 ||  || — || December 11, 2012 || Catalina || CSS || — || align=right | 2.5 km || 
|-id=021 bgcolor=#E9E9E9
| 479021 ||  || — || March 15, 2004 || Kitt Peak || Spacewatch || — || align=right | 1.7 km || 
|-id=022 bgcolor=#E9E9E9
| 479022 ||  || — || December 6, 2012 || Mount Lemmon || Mount Lemmon Survey || — || align=right | 1.9 km || 
|-id=023 bgcolor=#E9E9E9
| 479023 ||  || — || November 3, 1999 || Socorro || LINEAR || — || align=right | 1.4 km || 
|-id=024 bgcolor=#d6d6d6
| 479024 ||  || — || May 18, 2010 || WISE || WISE || — || align=right | 4.4 km || 
|-id=025 bgcolor=#d6d6d6
| 479025 ||  || — || January 3, 2013 || Mount Lemmon || Mount Lemmon Survey || — || align=right | 2.8 km || 
|-id=026 bgcolor=#d6d6d6
| 479026 ||  || — || June 20, 2010 || WISE || WISE || 7:4 || align=right | 4.2 km || 
|-id=027 bgcolor=#E9E9E9
| 479027 ||  || — || November 14, 2012 || Mount Lemmon || Mount Lemmon Survey || (1547) || align=right | 1.5 km || 
|-id=028 bgcolor=#d6d6d6
| 479028 ||  || — || March 2, 2008 || Mount Lemmon || Mount Lemmon Survey || — || align=right | 3.0 km || 
|-id=029 bgcolor=#E9E9E9
| 479029 ||  || — || November 12, 2012 || Mount Lemmon || Mount Lemmon Survey || — || align=right | 2.5 km || 
|-id=030 bgcolor=#FA8072
| 479030 ||  || — || October 31, 1999 || Socorro || LINEAR || — || align=right | 1.8 km || 
|-id=031 bgcolor=#d6d6d6
| 479031 ||  || — || January 13, 2002 || Kitt Peak || Spacewatch || — || align=right | 2.9 km || 
|-id=032 bgcolor=#d6d6d6
| 479032 ||  || — || January 5, 2013 || Mount Lemmon || Mount Lemmon Survey || — || align=right | 2.5 km || 
|-id=033 bgcolor=#E9E9E9
| 479033 ||  || — || December 10, 2012 || Mount Lemmon || Mount Lemmon Survey || — || align=right | 2.0 km || 
|-id=034 bgcolor=#d6d6d6
| 479034 ||  || — || December 11, 2012 || Mount Lemmon || Mount Lemmon Survey || — || align=right | 3.2 km || 
|-id=035 bgcolor=#E9E9E9
| 479035 ||  || — || December 19, 2007 || Kitt Peak || Spacewatch || — || align=right | 1.9 km || 
|-id=036 bgcolor=#E9E9E9
| 479036 ||  || — || September 22, 2003 || Kitt Peak || Spacewatch || — || align=right | 1.2 km || 
|-id=037 bgcolor=#d6d6d6
| 479037 ||  || — || May 16, 2010 || WISE || WISE || — || align=right | 4.2 km || 
|-id=038 bgcolor=#d6d6d6
| 479038 ||  || — || December 17, 2007 || Kitt Peak || Spacewatch || — || align=right | 3.0 km || 
|-id=039 bgcolor=#E9E9E9
| 479039 ||  || — || January 31, 2009 || Mount Lemmon || Mount Lemmon Survey || — || align=right | 1.9 km || 
|-id=040 bgcolor=#d6d6d6
| 479040 ||  || — || December 12, 2012 || Kitt Peak || Spacewatch || — || align=right | 3.6 km || 
|-id=041 bgcolor=#d6d6d6
| 479041 ||  || — || January 10, 2008 || Kitt Peak || Spacewatch || — || align=right | 2.4 km || 
|-id=042 bgcolor=#d6d6d6
| 479042 ||  || — || July 6, 2005 || Kitt Peak || Spacewatch || EOS || align=right | 1.9 km || 
|-id=043 bgcolor=#d6d6d6
| 479043 ||  || — || November 15, 2006 || Mount Lemmon || Mount Lemmon Survey || — || align=right | 1.9 km || 
|-id=044 bgcolor=#d6d6d6
| 479044 ||  || — || September 12, 2010 || Mount Lemmon || Mount Lemmon Survey || — || align=right | 3.3 km || 
|-id=045 bgcolor=#d6d6d6
| 479045 ||  || — || March 6, 2008 || Mount Lemmon || Mount Lemmon Survey || VER || align=right | 2.1 km || 
|-id=046 bgcolor=#d6d6d6
| 479046 ||  || — || December 16, 2007 || Mount Lemmon || Mount Lemmon Survey || — || align=right | 2.5 km || 
|-id=047 bgcolor=#d6d6d6
| 479047 ||  || — || January 11, 2008 || Kitt Peak || Spacewatch || — || align=right | 2.9 km || 
|-id=048 bgcolor=#d6d6d6
| 479048 ||  || — || February 2, 2008 || Kitt Peak || Spacewatch || EMA || align=right | 2.9 km || 
|-id=049 bgcolor=#d6d6d6
| 479049 ||  || — || March 18, 2009 || Mount Lemmon || Mount Lemmon Survey || — || align=right | 2.1 km || 
|-id=050 bgcolor=#E9E9E9
| 479050 ||  || — || December 29, 2008 || Mount Lemmon || Mount Lemmon Survey || — || align=right | 2.3 km || 
|-id=051 bgcolor=#d6d6d6
| 479051 ||  || — || March 19, 2009 || Mount Lemmon || Mount Lemmon Survey || EOS || align=right | 2.3 km || 
|-id=052 bgcolor=#E9E9E9
| 479052 ||  || — || February 11, 2004 || Anderson Mesa || LONEOS || — || align=right | 2.0 km || 
|-id=053 bgcolor=#d6d6d6
| 479053 ||  || — || November 12, 2012 || Mount Lemmon || Mount Lemmon Survey || — || align=right | 4.5 km || 
|-id=054 bgcolor=#d6d6d6
| 479054 ||  || — || March 9, 2008 || Mount Lemmon || Mount Lemmon Survey || — || align=right | 3.1 km || 
|-id=055 bgcolor=#d6d6d6
| 479055 ||  || — || February 8, 2008 || Kitt Peak || Spacewatch || — || align=right | 2.5 km || 
|-id=056 bgcolor=#d6d6d6
| 479056 ||  || — || December 16, 2007 || Mount Lemmon || Mount Lemmon Survey || TRE || align=right | 2.3 km || 
|-id=057 bgcolor=#E9E9E9
| 479057 ||  || — || October 3, 2002 || Socorro || LINEAR || — || align=right | 2.5 km || 
|-id=058 bgcolor=#d6d6d6
| 479058 ||  || — || February 7, 2008 || Mount Lemmon || Mount Lemmon Survey || EOS || align=right | 1.7 km || 
|-id=059 bgcolor=#d6d6d6
| 479059 ||  || — || January 14, 2008 || Kitt Peak || Spacewatch || — || align=right | 2.9 km || 
|-id=060 bgcolor=#d6d6d6
| 479060 ||  || — || January 21, 2002 || Kitt Peak || Spacewatch || — || align=right | 4.3 km || 
|-id=061 bgcolor=#E9E9E9
| 479061 ||  || — || January 15, 2004 || Kitt Peak || Spacewatch || AEO || align=right data-sort-value="0.86" | 860 m || 
|-id=062 bgcolor=#E9E9E9
| 479062 ||  || — || September 13, 2007 || Kitt Peak || Spacewatch || — || align=right | 1.4 km || 
|-id=063 bgcolor=#d6d6d6
| 479063 ||  || — || January 18, 2008 || Kitt Peak || Spacewatch || TEL || align=right | 1.1 km || 
|-id=064 bgcolor=#E9E9E9
| 479064 ||  || — || October 16, 2007 || Catalina || CSS || — || align=right | 2.1 km || 
|-id=065 bgcolor=#E9E9E9
| 479065 ||  || — || September 14, 2007 || Catalina || CSS || — || align=right | 1.8 km || 
|-id=066 bgcolor=#d6d6d6
| 479066 ||  || — || January 10, 2008 || Kitt Peak || Spacewatch || — || align=right | 1.9 km || 
|-id=067 bgcolor=#E9E9E9
| 479067 ||  || — || October 3, 2003 || Kitt Peak || Spacewatch || — || align=right | 1.3 km || 
|-id=068 bgcolor=#d6d6d6
| 479068 ||  || — || December 6, 2007 || Kitt Peak || Spacewatch || — || align=right | 2.6 km || 
|-id=069 bgcolor=#d6d6d6
| 479069 ||  || — || May 20, 2004 || Campo Imperatore || CINEOS || TEL || align=right | 1.4 km || 
|-id=070 bgcolor=#d6d6d6
| 479070 ||  || — || September 19, 2006 || Kitt Peak || Spacewatch || KOR || align=right | 1.1 km || 
|-id=071 bgcolor=#E9E9E9
| 479071 ||  || — || December 4, 2007 || Kitt Peak || Spacewatch || — || align=right | 1.8 km || 
|-id=072 bgcolor=#d6d6d6
| 479072 ||  || — || June 1, 2009 || Mount Lemmon || Mount Lemmon Survey || — || align=right | 4.6 km || 
|-id=073 bgcolor=#d6d6d6
| 479073 ||  || — || November 13, 2012 || Mount Lemmon || Mount Lemmon Survey || — || align=right | 3.0 km || 
|-id=074 bgcolor=#d6d6d6
| 479074 ||  || — || September 22, 2006 || Catalina || CSS || — || align=right | 4.4 km || 
|-id=075 bgcolor=#E9E9E9
| 479075 ||  || — || March 2, 2009 || Mount Lemmon || Mount Lemmon Survey || — || align=right | 2.0 km || 
|-id=076 bgcolor=#E9E9E9
| 479076 ||  || — || October 14, 2007 || Catalina || CSS || — || align=right | 1.7 km || 
|-id=077 bgcolor=#E9E9E9
| 479077 ||  || — || November 2, 2007 || Kitt Peak || Spacewatch || MRX || align=right data-sort-value="0.96" | 960 m || 
|-id=078 bgcolor=#d6d6d6
| 479078 ||  || — || January 9, 2013 || Catalina || CSS || — || align=right | 3.7 km || 
|-id=079 bgcolor=#E9E9E9
| 479079 ||  || — || December 13, 1999 || Kitt Peak || Spacewatch || — || align=right | 1.1 km || 
|-id=080 bgcolor=#d6d6d6
| 479080 ||  || — || November 9, 2007 || Kitt Peak || Spacewatch || — || align=right | 2.3 km || 
|-id=081 bgcolor=#d6d6d6
| 479081 ||  || — || April 10, 2010 || WISE || WISE || — || align=right | 2.9 km || 
|-id=082 bgcolor=#E9E9E9
| 479082 ||  || — || September 13, 2007 || Kitt Peak || Spacewatch || — || align=right | 2.0 km || 
|-id=083 bgcolor=#d6d6d6
| 479083 ||  || — || September 20, 2011 || Kitt Peak || Spacewatch || — || align=right | 2.7 km || 
|-id=084 bgcolor=#E9E9E9
| 479084 ||  || — || November 20, 2007 || Mount Lemmon || Mount Lemmon Survey || — || align=right | 1.7 km || 
|-id=085 bgcolor=#d6d6d6
| 479085 ||  || — || September 22, 2006 || Catalina || CSS || — || align=right | 3.2 km || 
|-id=086 bgcolor=#E9E9E9
| 479086 ||  || — || March 17, 2004 || Kitt Peak || Spacewatch || — || align=right | 2.0 km || 
|-id=087 bgcolor=#d6d6d6
| 479087 ||  || — || October 22, 2006 || Mount Lemmon || Mount Lemmon Survey || — || align=right | 3.4 km || 
|-id=088 bgcolor=#d6d6d6
| 479088 ||  || — || January 19, 2008 || Mount Lemmon || Mount Lemmon Survey ||  || align=right | 3.5 km || 
|-id=089 bgcolor=#d6d6d6
| 479089 ||  || — || March 7, 2008 || Kitt Peak || Spacewatch || — || align=right | 2.7 km || 
|-id=090 bgcolor=#d6d6d6
| 479090 ||  || — || January 5, 2013 || Kitt Peak || Spacewatch || — || align=right | 3.0 km || 
|-id=091 bgcolor=#E9E9E9
| 479091 ||  || — || January 10, 2008 || Mount Lemmon || Mount Lemmon Survey || — || align=right | 1.9 km || 
|-id=092 bgcolor=#E9E9E9
| 479092 ||  || — || September 12, 2007 || Mount Lemmon || Mount Lemmon Survey || — || align=right | 2.1 km || 
|-id=093 bgcolor=#E9E9E9
| 479093 ||  || — || November 7, 2007 || Kitt Peak || Spacewatch || — || align=right | 1.8 km || 
|-id=094 bgcolor=#d6d6d6
| 479094 ||  || — || December 30, 2007 || Kitt Peak || Spacewatch || EOS || align=right | 1.8 km || 
|-id=095 bgcolor=#d6d6d6
| 479095 ||  || — || September 28, 2011 || Kitt Peak || Spacewatch || — || align=right | 2.1 km || 
|-id=096 bgcolor=#d6d6d6
| 479096 ||  || — || November 7, 2007 || Kitt Peak || Spacewatch || — || align=right | 3.7 km || 
|-id=097 bgcolor=#d6d6d6
| 479097 ||  || — || February 6, 2002 || Kitt Peak || Spacewatch || — || align=right | 3.3 km || 
|-id=098 bgcolor=#d6d6d6
| 479098 ||  || — || January 20, 2008 || Kitt Peak || Spacewatch || — || align=right | 2.9 km || 
|-id=099 bgcolor=#E9E9E9
| 479099 ||  || — || November 2, 2007 || Mount Lemmon || Mount Lemmon Survey || AGN || align=right | 1.1 km || 
|-id=100 bgcolor=#d6d6d6
| 479100 ||  || — || January 30, 2008 || Mount Lemmon || Mount Lemmon Survey || — || align=right | 2.3 km || 
|}

479101–479200 

|-bgcolor=#d6d6d6
| 479101 ||  || — || October 3, 2011 || XuYi || PMO NEO || — || align=right | 2.5 km || 
|-id=102 bgcolor=#E9E9E9
| 479102 ||  || — || October 15, 2007 || Mount Lemmon || Mount Lemmon Survey || — || align=right | 1.6 km || 
|-id=103 bgcolor=#d6d6d6
| 479103 ||  || — || October 2, 2006 || Mount Lemmon || Mount Lemmon Survey || EOS || align=right | 1.3 km || 
|-id=104 bgcolor=#d6d6d6
| 479104 ||  || — || November 19, 2006 || Kitt Peak || Spacewatch || — || align=right | 3.1 km || 
|-id=105 bgcolor=#E9E9E9
| 479105 ||  || — || September 19, 2011 || Catalina || CSS || — || align=right | 2.3 km || 
|-id=106 bgcolor=#d6d6d6
| 479106 ||  || — || November 16, 2001 || Kitt Peak || Spacewatch || — || align=right | 2.0 km || 
|-id=107 bgcolor=#E9E9E9
| 479107 ||  || — || September 12, 2007 || Catalina || CSS || — || align=right | 1.5 km || 
|-id=108 bgcolor=#d6d6d6
| 479108 ||  || — || October 20, 2011 || Mount Lemmon || Mount Lemmon Survey || EOS || align=right | 1.7 km || 
|-id=109 bgcolor=#d6d6d6
| 479109 ||  || — || April 21, 2009 || Kitt Peak || Spacewatch || — || align=right | 2.5 km || 
|-id=110 bgcolor=#d6d6d6
| 479110 ||  || — || September 23, 2011 || Kitt Peak || Spacewatch || EMA || align=right | 2.5 km || 
|-id=111 bgcolor=#d6d6d6
| 479111 ||  || — || September 26, 2005 || Kitt Peak || Spacewatch || — || align=right | 2.8 km || 
|-id=112 bgcolor=#E9E9E9
| 479112 ||  || — || October 12, 2007 || Kitt Peak || Spacewatch || — || align=right | 1.4 km || 
|-id=113 bgcolor=#E9E9E9
| 479113 ||  || — || November 7, 2007 || Catalina || CSS || — || align=right | 2.1 km || 
|-id=114 bgcolor=#E9E9E9
| 479114 ||  || — || May 20, 2005 || Mount Lemmon || Mount Lemmon Survey || — || align=right | 2.3 km || 
|-id=115 bgcolor=#E9E9E9
| 479115 ||  || — || January 13, 2005 || Kitt Peak || Spacewatch || — || align=right data-sort-value="0.98" | 980 m || 
|-id=116 bgcolor=#d6d6d6
| 479116 ||  || — || April 29, 2009 || Mount Lemmon || Mount Lemmon Survey || — || align=right | 2.7 km || 
|-id=117 bgcolor=#d6d6d6
| 479117 ||  || — || February 2, 2008 || Kitt Peak || Spacewatch || — || align=right | 2.5 km || 
|-id=118 bgcolor=#E9E9E9
| 479118 ||  || — || December 15, 2007 || Mount Lemmon || Mount Lemmon Survey || DOR || align=right | 2.0 km || 
|-id=119 bgcolor=#E9E9E9
| 479119 ||  || — || October 15, 2007 || Mount Lemmon || Mount Lemmon Survey || — || align=right | 1.9 km || 
|-id=120 bgcolor=#d6d6d6
| 479120 ||  || — || January 10, 2008 || Mount Lemmon || Mount Lemmon Survey || — || align=right | 2.6 km || 
|-id=121 bgcolor=#d6d6d6
| 479121 ||  || — || February 10, 2008 || Mount Lemmon || Mount Lemmon Survey || — || align=right | 2.2 km || 
|-id=122 bgcolor=#E9E9E9
| 479122 ||  || — || January 8, 2000 || Kitt Peak || Spacewatch || — || align=right | 1.5 km || 
|-id=123 bgcolor=#E9E9E9
| 479123 ||  || — || August 29, 2006 || Kitt Peak || Spacewatch || — || align=right | 2.1 km || 
|-id=124 bgcolor=#d6d6d6
| 479124 ||  || — || May 24, 2010 || WISE || WISE || — || align=right | 3.3 km || 
|-id=125 bgcolor=#d6d6d6
| 479125 ||  || — || September 17, 2006 || Kitt Peak || Spacewatch || — || align=right | 1.9 km || 
|-id=126 bgcolor=#d6d6d6
| 479126 ||  || — || June 16, 2010 || WISE || WISE || — || align=right | 4.1 km || 
|-id=127 bgcolor=#FA8072
| 479127 ||  || — || October 13, 2007 || Mount Lemmon || Mount Lemmon Survey || — || align=right | 1.5 km || 
|-id=128 bgcolor=#d6d6d6
| 479128 ||  || — || November 17, 2006 || Kitt Peak || Spacewatch || — || align=right | 3.0 km || 
|-id=129 bgcolor=#d6d6d6
| 479129 ||  || — || October 20, 2006 || Mount Lemmon || Mount Lemmon Survey || — || align=right | 2.5 km || 
|-id=130 bgcolor=#E9E9E9
| 479130 ||  || — || January 8, 1999 || Kitt Peak || Spacewatch || DOR || align=right | 2.1 km || 
|-id=131 bgcolor=#E9E9E9
| 479131 ||  || — || October 14, 2007 || Mount Lemmon || Mount Lemmon Survey || DOR || align=right | 2.0 km || 
|-id=132 bgcolor=#d6d6d6
| 479132 ||  || — || February 2, 2008 || Mount Lemmon || Mount Lemmon Survey || — || align=right | 2.3 km || 
|-id=133 bgcolor=#d6d6d6
| 479133 ||  || — || January 21, 2002 || Kitt Peak || Spacewatch || — || align=right | 3.1 km || 
|-id=134 bgcolor=#d6d6d6
| 479134 ||  || — || February 10, 2002 || Socorro || LINEAR || — || align=right | 3.2 km || 
|-id=135 bgcolor=#E9E9E9
| 479135 ||  || — || March 1, 2005 || Kitt Peak || Spacewatch || — || align=right | 1.2 km || 
|-id=136 bgcolor=#E9E9E9
| 479136 ||  || — || January 7, 2013 || Kitt Peak || Spacewatch || — || align=right | 1.6 km || 
|-id=137 bgcolor=#d6d6d6
| 479137 ||  || — || February 8, 2008 || Mount Lemmon || Mount Lemmon Survey || — || align=right | 2.7 km || 
|-id=138 bgcolor=#E9E9E9
| 479138 ||  || — || September 8, 2011 || Kitt Peak || Spacewatch || AGN || align=right | 1.1 km || 
|-id=139 bgcolor=#d6d6d6
| 479139 ||  || — || March 11, 2008 || Mount Lemmon || Mount Lemmon Survey || — || align=right | 3.3 km || 
|-id=140 bgcolor=#d6d6d6
| 479140 ||  || — || December 20, 2007 || Kitt Peak || Spacewatch || — || align=right | 2.2 km || 
|-id=141 bgcolor=#E9E9E9
| 479141 ||  || — || December 7, 2012 || Mount Lemmon || Mount Lemmon Survey || — || align=right | 2.4 km || 
|-id=142 bgcolor=#d6d6d6
| 479142 ||  || — || November 2, 2007 || Mount Lemmon || Mount Lemmon Survey || — || align=right | 1.9 km || 
|-id=143 bgcolor=#d6d6d6
| 479143 ||  || — || January 18, 2013 || Mount Lemmon || Mount Lemmon Survey || — || align=right | 3.0 km || 
|-id=144 bgcolor=#d6d6d6
| 479144 ||  || — || February 12, 2008 || Mount Lemmon || Mount Lemmon Survey || — || align=right | 3.3 km || 
|-id=145 bgcolor=#E9E9E9
| 479145 ||  || — || December 29, 2003 || Anderson Mesa || LONEOS || — || align=right | 2.0 km || 
|-id=146 bgcolor=#d6d6d6
| 479146 ||  || — || March 1, 2008 || Kitt Peak || Spacewatch || — || align=right | 3.5 km || 
|-id=147 bgcolor=#d6d6d6
| 479147 ||  || — || January 22, 2013 || Mount Lemmon || Mount Lemmon Survey || — || align=right | 2.8 km || 
|-id=148 bgcolor=#E9E9E9
| 479148 ||  || — || September 24, 2011 || Mount Lemmon || Mount Lemmon Survey || AGN || align=right | 1.2 km || 
|-id=149 bgcolor=#d6d6d6
| 479149 ||  || — || December 15, 2006 || Kitt Peak || Spacewatch || — || align=right | 3.4 km || 
|-id=150 bgcolor=#d6d6d6
| 479150 ||  || — || August 30, 2005 || Kitt Peak || Spacewatch || — || align=right | 3.4 km || 
|-id=151 bgcolor=#d6d6d6
| 479151 ||  || — || February 2, 2008 || Kitt Peak || Spacewatch || — || align=right | 3.4 km || 
|-id=152 bgcolor=#d6d6d6
| 479152 ||  || — || January 9, 2013 || Kitt Peak || Spacewatch || — || align=right | 3.4 km || 
|-id=153 bgcolor=#d6d6d6
| 479153 ||  || — || January 10, 2007 || Kitt Peak || Spacewatch || — || align=right | 3.1 km || 
|-id=154 bgcolor=#d6d6d6
| 479154 ||  || — || December 11, 2012 || Mount Lemmon || Mount Lemmon Survey || — || align=right | 3.2 km || 
|-id=155 bgcolor=#d6d6d6
| 479155 ||  || — || October 23, 2011 || Mount Lemmon || Mount Lemmon Survey || — || align=right | 2.2 km || 
|-id=156 bgcolor=#E9E9E9
| 479156 ||  || — || December 4, 2007 || Kitt Peak || Spacewatch || — || align=right | 1.9 km || 
|-id=157 bgcolor=#d6d6d6
| 479157 ||  || — || March 6, 2008 || Mount Lemmon || Mount Lemmon Survey || VER || align=right | 3.6 km || 
|-id=158 bgcolor=#E9E9E9
| 479158 ||  || — || October 9, 2007 || Catalina || CSS || — || align=right | 1.8 km || 
|-id=159 bgcolor=#d6d6d6
| 479159 ||  || — || June 7, 2010 || WISE || WISE || — || align=right | 4.8 km || 
|-id=160 bgcolor=#d6d6d6
| 479160 ||  || — || November 1, 2006 || Mount Lemmon || Mount Lemmon Survey || — || align=right | 2.2 km || 
|-id=161 bgcolor=#d6d6d6
| 479161 ||  || — || February 1, 2013 || Kitt Peak || Spacewatch || EOS || align=right | 1.3 km || 
|-id=162 bgcolor=#d6d6d6
| 479162 ||  || — || September 17, 2010 || Mount Lemmon || Mount Lemmon Survey || VER || align=right | 2.5 km || 
|-id=163 bgcolor=#d6d6d6
| 479163 ||  || — || October 22, 2006 || Mount Lemmon || Mount Lemmon Survey || — || align=right | 2.5 km || 
|-id=164 bgcolor=#d6d6d6
| 479164 ||  || — || November 3, 2011 || Mount Lemmon || Mount Lemmon Survey || — || align=right | 3.1 km || 
|-id=165 bgcolor=#d6d6d6
| 479165 ||  || — || May 20, 2010 || WISE || WISE || VER || align=right | 3.4 km || 
|-id=166 bgcolor=#d6d6d6
| 479166 ||  || — || February 10, 2002 || Kitt Peak || Spacewatch || EOS || align=right | 2.2 km || 
|-id=167 bgcolor=#d6d6d6
| 479167 ||  || — || October 25, 2011 || XuYi || PMO NEO || — || align=right | 2.9 km || 
|-id=168 bgcolor=#E9E9E9
| 479168 ||  || — || January 1, 2008 || Kitt Peak || Spacewatch || HOF || align=right | 2.6 km || 
|-id=169 bgcolor=#d6d6d6
| 479169 ||  || — || March 3, 2008 || XuYi || PMO NEO || — || align=right | 3.7 km || 
|-id=170 bgcolor=#d6d6d6
| 479170 ||  || — || February 24, 2008 || Mount Lemmon || Mount Lemmon Survey || — || align=right | 3.6 km || 
|-id=171 bgcolor=#E9E9E9
| 479171 ||  || — || October 20, 2007 || Mount Lemmon || Mount Lemmon Survey || — || align=right | 1.7 km || 
|-id=172 bgcolor=#d6d6d6
| 479172 ||  || — || February 7, 2008 || Mount Lemmon || Mount Lemmon Survey || — || align=right | 3.3 km || 
|-id=173 bgcolor=#E9E9E9
| 479173 ||  || — || December 17, 2007 || Catalina || CSS || — || align=right | 2.2 km || 
|-id=174 bgcolor=#d6d6d6
| 479174 ||  || — || February 5, 2013 || Kitt Peak || Spacewatch || — || align=right | 2.5 km || 
|-id=175 bgcolor=#d6d6d6
| 479175 ||  || — || September 19, 2010 || Kitt Peak || Spacewatch || EOS || align=right | 2.0 km || 
|-id=176 bgcolor=#E9E9E9
| 479176 ||  || — || March 2, 2009 || Kitt Peak || Spacewatch || — || align=right | 1.1 km || 
|-id=177 bgcolor=#E9E9E9
| 479177 ||  || — || February 12, 2004 || Kitt Peak || Spacewatch || — || align=right | 1.7 km || 
|-id=178 bgcolor=#E9E9E9
| 479178 ||  || — || November 19, 2003 || Campo Imperatore || CINEOS || (5) || align=right data-sort-value="0.84" | 840 m || 
|-id=179 bgcolor=#d6d6d6
| 479179 ||  || — || March 26, 2006 || Mount Lemmon || Mount Lemmon Survey || 3:2 || align=right | 4.8 km || 
|-id=180 bgcolor=#d6d6d6
| 479180 ||  || — || January 12, 2002 || Kitt Peak || Spacewatch || — || align=right | 2.9 km || 
|-id=181 bgcolor=#d6d6d6
| 479181 ||  || — || October 4, 2005 || Catalina || CSS || — || align=right | 6.4 km || 
|-id=182 bgcolor=#d6d6d6
| 479182 ||  || — || May 3, 2010 || WISE || WISE || — || align=right | 3.4 km || 
|-id=183 bgcolor=#d6d6d6
| 479183 ||  || — || June 18, 2010 || WISE || WISE || — || align=right | 3.8 km || 
|-id=184 bgcolor=#d6d6d6
| 479184 ||  || — || January 23, 2013 || Mount Lemmon || Mount Lemmon Survey || BRA || align=right | 1.4 km || 
|-id=185 bgcolor=#d6d6d6
| 479185 ||  || — || September 12, 2005 || Kitt Peak || Spacewatch || — || align=right | 2.9 km || 
|-id=186 bgcolor=#d6d6d6
| 479186 ||  || — || January 20, 2013 || Kitt Peak || Spacewatch || — || align=right | 3.1 km || 
|-id=187 bgcolor=#d6d6d6
| 479187 ||  || — || February 8, 2002 || Kitt Peak || Spacewatch || — || align=right | 2.6 km || 
|-id=188 bgcolor=#d6d6d6
| 479188 ||  || — || February 6, 1997 || Caussols || ODAS || — || align=right | 3.0 km || 
|-id=189 bgcolor=#d6d6d6
| 479189 ||  || — || March 26, 2008 || Mount Lemmon || Mount Lemmon Survey || — || align=right | 2.2 km || 
|-id=190 bgcolor=#d6d6d6
| 479190 ||  || — || August 28, 2005 || Kitt Peak || Spacewatch || — || align=right | 2.7 km || 
|-id=191 bgcolor=#d6d6d6
| 479191 ||  || — || September 23, 2011 || Kitt Peak || Spacewatch || — || align=right | 2.6 km || 
|-id=192 bgcolor=#d6d6d6
| 479192 ||  || — || January 14, 2002 || Kitt Peak || Spacewatch || — || align=right | 2.6 km || 
|-id=193 bgcolor=#d6d6d6
| 479193 ||  || — || January 22, 2013 || Mount Lemmon || Mount Lemmon Survey || — || align=right | 3.2 km || 
|-id=194 bgcolor=#d6d6d6
| 479194 ||  || — || December 13, 2006 || Mount Lemmon || Mount Lemmon Survey || — || align=right | 3.8 km || 
|-id=195 bgcolor=#d6d6d6
| 479195 ||  || — || January 4, 2013 || Kitt Peak || Spacewatch || — || align=right | 3.6 km || 
|-id=196 bgcolor=#E9E9E9
| 479196 ||  || — || December 28, 2003 || Socorro || LINEAR || JUN || align=right data-sort-value="0.98" | 980 m || 
|-id=197 bgcolor=#d6d6d6
| 479197 ||  || — || January 10, 2007 || Mount Lemmon || Mount Lemmon Survey || — || align=right | 2.5 km || 
|-id=198 bgcolor=#d6d6d6
| 479198 ||  || — || September 3, 2010 || Mount Lemmon || Mount Lemmon Survey || — || align=right | 3.1 km || 
|-id=199 bgcolor=#d6d6d6
| 479199 ||  || — || March 23, 2003 || Kitt Peak || Spacewatch || — || align=right | 3.1 km || 
|-id=200 bgcolor=#d6d6d6
| 479200 ||  || — || October 31, 2005 || Kitt Peak || Spacewatch || — || align=right | 3.0 km || 
|}

479201–479300 

|-bgcolor=#d6d6d6
| 479201 ||  || — || February 2, 2008 || Kitt Peak || Spacewatch || — || align=right | 2.5 km || 
|-id=202 bgcolor=#E9E9E9
| 479202 ||  || — || July 21, 2006 || Mount Lemmon || Mount Lemmon Survey || — || align=right | 2.2 km || 
|-id=203 bgcolor=#d6d6d6
| 479203 ||  || — || November 14, 2006 || Kitt Peak || Spacewatch || — || align=right | 2.3 km || 
|-id=204 bgcolor=#d6d6d6
| 479204 ||  || — || October 18, 2011 || Mount Lemmon || Mount Lemmon Survey || — || align=right | 2.0 km || 
|-id=205 bgcolor=#d6d6d6
| 479205 ||  || — || January 11, 2008 || Mount Lemmon || Mount Lemmon Survey || — || align=right | 2.6 km || 
|-id=206 bgcolor=#d6d6d6
| 479206 ||  || — || January 14, 2002 || Kitt Peak || Spacewatch || — || align=right | 2.7 km || 
|-id=207 bgcolor=#d6d6d6
| 479207 ||  || — || February 10, 1996 || Kitt Peak || Spacewatch || — || align=right | 4.8 km || 
|-id=208 bgcolor=#d6d6d6
| 479208 ||  || — || September 2, 2010 || Mount Lemmon || Mount Lemmon Survey || — || align=right | 3.0 km || 
|-id=209 bgcolor=#d6d6d6
| 479209 ||  || — || July 11, 2010 || WISE || WISE || — || align=right | 3.5 km || 
|-id=210 bgcolor=#E9E9E9
| 479210 ||  || — || February 2, 2009 || Catalina || CSS || — || align=right | 1.7 km || 
|-id=211 bgcolor=#E9E9E9
| 479211 ||  || — || September 24, 2011 || Mount Lemmon || Mount Lemmon Survey || — || align=right | 2.0 km || 
|-id=212 bgcolor=#E9E9E9
| 479212 ||  || — || January 19, 2004 || Kitt Peak || Spacewatch || AEO || align=right | 1.2 km || 
|-id=213 bgcolor=#d6d6d6
| 479213 ||  || — || September 30, 2010 || Mount Lemmon || Mount Lemmon Survey || — || align=right | 3.2 km || 
|-id=214 bgcolor=#d6d6d6
| 479214 ||  || — || February 10, 2002 || Socorro || LINEAR || — || align=right | 4.6 km || 
|-id=215 bgcolor=#d6d6d6
| 479215 ||  || — || February 13, 2008 || Mount Lemmon || Mount Lemmon Survey || — || align=right | 2.5 km || 
|-id=216 bgcolor=#d6d6d6
| 479216 ||  || — || November 1, 2011 || Catalina || CSS || — || align=right | 2.7 km || 
|-id=217 bgcolor=#d6d6d6
| 479217 ||  || — || February 6, 2013 || Kitt Peak || Spacewatch || — || align=right | 3.0 km || 
|-id=218 bgcolor=#d6d6d6
| 479218 ||  || — || February 10, 2002 || Socorro || LINEAR || — || align=right | 2.6 km || 
|-id=219 bgcolor=#d6d6d6
| 479219 ||  || — || September 12, 2010 || Mount Lemmon || Mount Lemmon Survey || — || align=right | 2.7 km || 
|-id=220 bgcolor=#d6d6d6
| 479220 ||  || — || September 11, 2010 || Catalina || CSS || — || align=right | 3.5 km || 
|-id=221 bgcolor=#E9E9E9
| 479221 ||  || — || March 15, 2004 || Kitt Peak || Spacewatch || — || align=right | 2.2 km || 
|-id=222 bgcolor=#d6d6d6
| 479222 ||  || — || February 15, 2002 || Kitt Peak || Spacewatch || — || align=right | 2.7 km || 
|-id=223 bgcolor=#d6d6d6
| 479223 ||  || — || September 23, 2011 || Kitt Peak || Spacewatch || EMA || align=right | 2.8 km || 
|-id=224 bgcolor=#E9E9E9
| 479224 ||  || — || November 8, 2007 || Kitt Peak || Spacewatch || AEO || align=right | 1.1 km || 
|-id=225 bgcolor=#d6d6d6
| 479225 ||  || — || April 14, 2008 || Catalina || CSS || — || align=right | 2.9 km || 
|-id=226 bgcolor=#E9E9E9
| 479226 ||  || — || October 10, 2007 || Catalina || CSS || JUN || align=right | 1.1 km || 
|-id=227 bgcolor=#d6d6d6
| 479227 ||  || — || January 19, 2013 || Kitt Peak || Spacewatch || — || align=right | 2.1 km || 
|-id=228 bgcolor=#E9E9E9
| 479228 ||  || — || November 20, 2012 || Mount Lemmon || Mount Lemmon Survey || — || align=right | 2.2 km || 
|-id=229 bgcolor=#E9E9E9
| 479229 ||  || — || November 4, 2007 || Mount Lemmon || Mount Lemmon Survey || — || align=right | 2.0 km || 
|-id=230 bgcolor=#d6d6d6
| 479230 ||  || — || December 17, 2001 || Socorro || LINEAR || — || align=right | 3.1 km || 
|-id=231 bgcolor=#E9E9E9
| 479231 ||  || — || February 4, 2000 || Kitt Peak || Spacewatch || — || align=right | 1.9 km || 
|-id=232 bgcolor=#d6d6d6
| 479232 ||  || — || November 2, 2011 || Mount Lemmon || Mount Lemmon Survey || EOS || align=right | 1.4 km || 
|-id=233 bgcolor=#d6d6d6
| 479233 ||  || — || January 19, 2013 || Kitt Peak || Spacewatch || — || align=right | 2.6 km || 
|-id=234 bgcolor=#d6d6d6
| 479234 ||  || — || January 30, 2008 || Mount Lemmon || Mount Lemmon Survey || — || align=right | 2.8 km || 
|-id=235 bgcolor=#d6d6d6
| 479235 ||  || — || February 8, 2008 || Kitt Peak || Spacewatch || — || align=right | 2.3 km || 
|-id=236 bgcolor=#d6d6d6
| 479236 ||  || — || February 9, 2008 || Kitt Peak || Spacewatch || — || align=right | 2.3 km || 
|-id=237 bgcolor=#d6d6d6
| 479237 ||  || — || October 19, 2011 || Kitt Peak || Spacewatch || — || align=right | 2.6 km || 
|-id=238 bgcolor=#d6d6d6
| 479238 ||  || — || May 3, 2010 || WISE || WISE || NAE || align=right | 3.4 km || 
|-id=239 bgcolor=#d6d6d6
| 479239 ||  || — || April 29, 2010 || WISE || WISE || EOS || align=right | 4.6 km || 
|-id=240 bgcolor=#d6d6d6
| 479240 ||  || — || July 18, 2010 || WISE || WISE || — || align=right | 3.7 km || 
|-id=241 bgcolor=#d6d6d6
| 479241 ||  || — || November 13, 2006 || Catalina || CSS || — || align=right | 2.5 km || 
|-id=242 bgcolor=#d6d6d6
| 479242 ||  || — || December 15, 2006 || Mount Lemmon || Mount Lemmon Survey || — || align=right | 3.1 km || 
|-id=243 bgcolor=#E9E9E9
| 479243 ||  || — || March 14, 2004 || Socorro || LINEAR || — || align=right | 2.2 km || 
|-id=244 bgcolor=#d6d6d6
| 479244 ||  || — || September 2, 2010 || Mount Lemmon || Mount Lemmon Survey || — || align=right | 2.7 km || 
|-id=245 bgcolor=#d6d6d6
| 479245 ||  || — || June 17, 2010 || WISE || WISE || — || align=right | 4.5 km || 
|-id=246 bgcolor=#d6d6d6
| 479246 ||  || — || September 5, 2010 || Mount Lemmon || Mount Lemmon Survey || — || align=right | 3.2 km || 
|-id=247 bgcolor=#d6d6d6
| 479247 ||  || — || December 9, 2006 || Kitt Peak || Spacewatch || LIX || align=right | 3.5 km || 
|-id=248 bgcolor=#d6d6d6
| 479248 ||  || — || January 30, 2008 || Mount Lemmon || Mount Lemmon Survey || — || align=right | 2.5 km || 
|-id=249 bgcolor=#d6d6d6
| 479249 ||  || — || June 9, 2010 || WISE || WISE || — || align=right | 4.2 km || 
|-id=250 bgcolor=#E9E9E9
| 479250 ||  || — || November 30, 2003 || Kitt Peak || Spacewatch || — || align=right | 1.5 km || 
|-id=251 bgcolor=#d6d6d6
| 479251 ||  || — || February 5, 2013 || Kitt Peak || Spacewatch || VER || align=right | 3.1 km || 
|-id=252 bgcolor=#d6d6d6
| 479252 ||  || — || September 1, 2010 || Mount Lemmon || Mount Lemmon Survey || — || align=right | 3.3 km || 
|-id=253 bgcolor=#d6d6d6
| 479253 ||  || — || January 19, 2002 || Kitt Peak || Spacewatch || — || align=right | 2.1 km || 
|-id=254 bgcolor=#d6d6d6
| 479254 ||  || — || April 9, 2002 || Kitt Peak || Spacewatch || — || align=right | 2.8 km || 
|-id=255 bgcolor=#d6d6d6
| 479255 ||  || — || March 11, 2013 || Kitt Peak || Spacewatch || — || align=right | 2.8 km || 
|-id=256 bgcolor=#d6d6d6
| 479256 ||  || — || May 20, 2010 || WISE || WISE || Tj (2.99) || align=right | 4.3 km || 
|-id=257 bgcolor=#E9E9E9
| 479257 ||  || — || September 15, 2007 || Mount Lemmon || Mount Lemmon Survey || — || align=right | 2.4 km || 
|-id=258 bgcolor=#d6d6d6
| 479258 ||  || — || October 27, 2005 || Kitt Peak || Spacewatch || — || align=right | 3.9 km || 
|-id=259 bgcolor=#d6d6d6
| 479259 ||  || — || November 28, 1999 || Kitt Peak || Spacewatch || — || align=right | 2.7 km || 
|-id=260 bgcolor=#d6d6d6
| 479260 ||  || — || October 8, 2010 || Kitt Peak || Spacewatch || — || align=right | 3.6 km || 
|-id=261 bgcolor=#d6d6d6
| 479261 ||  || — || May 1, 2003 || Kitt Peak || Spacewatch || — || align=right | 2.7 km || 
|-id=262 bgcolor=#d6d6d6
| 479262 ||  || — || January 28, 2007 || Mount Lemmon || Mount Lemmon Survey || — || align=right | 2.5 km || 
|-id=263 bgcolor=#d6d6d6
| 479263 ||  || — || March 13, 2013 || Kitt Peak || Spacewatch || EOS || align=right | 2.5 km || 
|-id=264 bgcolor=#d6d6d6
| 479264 ||  || — || December 2, 2005 || Mount Lemmon || Mount Lemmon Survey || — || align=right | 3.1 km || 
|-id=265 bgcolor=#d6d6d6
| 479265 ||  || — || October 10, 2005 || Catalina || CSS || — || align=right | 4.7 km || 
|-id=266 bgcolor=#d6d6d6
| 479266 ||  || — || February 12, 2002 || Kitt Peak || Spacewatch || — || align=right | 2.5 km || 
|-id=267 bgcolor=#d6d6d6
| 479267 ||  || — || April 15, 2008 || Mount Lemmon || Mount Lemmon Survey || — || align=right | 2.0 km || 
|-id=268 bgcolor=#d6d6d6
| 479268 ||  || — || January 13, 2002 || Kitt Peak || Spacewatch || — || align=right | 2.6 km || 
|-id=269 bgcolor=#d6d6d6
| 479269 ||  || — || March 4, 2008 || Mount Lemmon || Mount Lemmon Survey || — || align=right | 2.9 km || 
|-id=270 bgcolor=#d6d6d6
| 479270 ||  || — || October 27, 2005 || Kitt Peak || Spacewatch || EOS || align=right | 2.4 km || 
|-id=271 bgcolor=#d6d6d6
| 479271 ||  || — || January 3, 2012 || Mount Lemmon || Mount Lemmon Survey || — || align=right | 3.6 km || 
|-id=272 bgcolor=#d6d6d6
| 479272 ||  || — || March 29, 2008 || Kitt Peak || Spacewatch || — || align=right | 2.7 km || 
|-id=273 bgcolor=#d6d6d6
| 479273 ||  || — || March 13, 2002 || Socorro || LINEAR || — || align=right | 3.2 km || 
|-id=274 bgcolor=#d6d6d6
| 479274 ||  || — || March 11, 2008 || Catalina || CSS || — || align=right | 2.9 km || 
|-id=275 bgcolor=#d6d6d6
| 479275 ||  || — || September 26, 2005 || Kitt Peak || Spacewatch || — || align=right | 2.4 km || 
|-id=276 bgcolor=#d6d6d6
| 479276 ||  || — || September 29, 2010 || Mount Lemmon || Mount Lemmon Survey || — || align=right | 3.7 km || 
|-id=277 bgcolor=#d6d6d6
| 479277 ||  || — || March 13, 2007 || Catalina || CSS || THB || align=right | 3.0 km || 
|-id=278 bgcolor=#d6d6d6
| 479278 ||  || — || October 7, 2004 || Kitt Peak || Spacewatch || — || align=right | 5.3 km || 
|-id=279 bgcolor=#fefefe
| 479279 ||  || — || March 17, 2013 || Catalina || CSS || H || align=right data-sort-value="0.79" | 790 m || 
|-id=280 bgcolor=#d6d6d6
| 479280 ||  || — || November 30, 2011 || Kitt Peak || Spacewatch || — || align=right | 2.4 km || 
|-id=281 bgcolor=#d6d6d6
| 479281 ||  || — || February 27, 2007 || Catalina || CSS || Tj (2.98) || align=right | 4.2 km || 
|-id=282 bgcolor=#d6d6d6
| 479282 ||  || — || October 24, 2005 || Kitt Peak || Spacewatch || — || align=right | 3.1 km || 
|-id=283 bgcolor=#d6d6d6
| 479283 ||  || — || April 3, 2008 || Kitt Peak || Spacewatch || — || align=right | 2.7 km || 
|-id=284 bgcolor=#d6d6d6
| 479284 ||  || — || October 1, 2005 || Kitt Peak || Spacewatch || — || align=right | 2.8 km || 
|-id=285 bgcolor=#d6d6d6
| 479285 ||  || — || October 2, 2005 || Mount Lemmon || Mount Lemmon Survey || — || align=right | 3.3 km || 
|-id=286 bgcolor=#d6d6d6
| 479286 ||  || — || October 3, 1999 || Kitt Peak || Spacewatch || — || align=right | 5.3 km || 
|-id=287 bgcolor=#d6d6d6
| 479287 ||  || — || March 11, 2007 || Kitt Peak || Spacewatch || THM || align=right | 2.1 km || 
|-id=288 bgcolor=#FA8072
| 479288 ||  || — || March 14, 2005 || Mount Lemmon || Mount Lemmon Survey || — || align=right data-sort-value="0.49" | 490 m || 
|-id=289 bgcolor=#d6d6d6
| 479289 ||  || — || March 12, 2008 || Kitt Peak || Spacewatch || — || align=right | 2.2 km || 
|-id=290 bgcolor=#d6d6d6
| 479290 ||  || — || December 8, 2005 || Kitt Peak || Spacewatch || — || align=right | 3.7 km || 
|-id=291 bgcolor=#E9E9E9
| 479291 ||  || — || April 27, 2009 || Mount Lemmon || Mount Lemmon Survey || — || align=right | 2.3 km || 
|-id=292 bgcolor=#d6d6d6
| 479292 ||  || — || February 10, 2008 || Mount Lemmon || Mount Lemmon Survey || — || align=right | 3.4 km || 
|-id=293 bgcolor=#d6d6d6
| 479293 ||  || — || March 10, 2007 || Mount Lemmon || Mount Lemmon Survey || — || align=right | 3.3 km || 
|-id=294 bgcolor=#d6d6d6
| 479294 ||  || — || October 12, 2005 || Kitt Peak || Spacewatch || LIX || align=right | 3.2 km || 
|-id=295 bgcolor=#d6d6d6
| 479295 ||  || — || February 23, 2007 || Catalina || CSS || — || align=right | 3.7 km || 
|-id=296 bgcolor=#d6d6d6
| 479296 ||  || — || October 25, 2005 || Kitt Peak || Spacewatch || — || align=right | 2.6 km || 
|-id=297 bgcolor=#d6d6d6
| 479297 ||  || — || May 5, 2002 || Socorro || LINEAR || — || align=right | 4.0 km || 
|-id=298 bgcolor=#d6d6d6
| 479298 ||  || — || October 31, 2005 || Mount Lemmon || Mount Lemmon Survey || — || align=right | 2.7 km || 
|-id=299 bgcolor=#d6d6d6
| 479299 ||  || — || May 3, 2008 || Mount Lemmon || Mount Lemmon Survey || — || align=right | 2.1 km || 
|-id=300 bgcolor=#d6d6d6
| 479300 ||  || — || September 7, 2000 || Kitt Peak || Spacewatch || — || align=right | 3.2 km || 
|}

479301–479400 

|-bgcolor=#d6d6d6
| 479301 ||  || — || November 17, 2004 || Campo Imperatore || CINEOS || 7:4 || align=right | 4.0 km || 
|-id=302 bgcolor=#fefefe
| 479302 ||  || — || May 5, 2008 || Mount Lemmon || Mount Lemmon Survey || H || align=right data-sort-value="0.54" | 540 m || 
|-id=303 bgcolor=#fefefe
| 479303 ||  || — || October 18, 2001 || Socorro || LINEAR || H || align=right data-sort-value="0.85" | 850 m || 
|-id=304 bgcolor=#fefefe
| 479304 ||  || — || April 7, 2008 || Mount Lemmon || Mount Lemmon Survey || H || align=right data-sort-value="0.67" | 670 m || 
|-id=305 bgcolor=#FA8072
| 479305 ||  || — || November 21, 2009 || Mount Lemmon || Mount Lemmon Survey || H || align=right data-sort-value="0.66" | 660 m || 
|-id=306 bgcolor=#d6d6d6
| 479306 ||  || — || October 24, 2005 || Kitt Peak || Spacewatch || Tj (2.99) || align=right | 3.9 km || 
|-id=307 bgcolor=#fefefe
| 479307 ||  || — || September 19, 2001 || Socorro || LINEAR || H || align=right data-sort-value="0.78" | 780 m || 
|-id=308 bgcolor=#fefefe
| 479308 ||  || — || November 3, 2011 || Kitt Peak || Spacewatch || H || align=right data-sort-value="0.62" | 620 m || 
|-id=309 bgcolor=#d6d6d6
| 479309 ||  || — || December 2, 2005 || Kitt Peak || Spacewatch || — || align=right | 2.9 km || 
|-id=310 bgcolor=#fefefe
| 479310 ||  || — || June 9, 2013 || Mount Lemmon || Mount Lemmon Survey || H || align=right data-sort-value="0.59" | 590 m || 
|-id=311 bgcolor=#FA8072
| 479311 ||  || — || September 27, 2006 || Mount Lemmon || Mount Lemmon Survey || H || align=right data-sort-value="0.69" | 690 m || 
|-id=312 bgcolor=#E9E9E9
| 479312 ||  || — || January 2, 2003 || Socorro || LINEAR || — || align=right | 3.4 km || 
|-id=313 bgcolor=#fefefe
| 479313 ||  || — || December 28, 2011 || Catalina || CSS || H || align=right data-sort-value="0.72" | 720 m || 
|-id=314 bgcolor=#FA8072
| 479314 ||  || — || March 17, 2007 || Catalina || CSS || critical || align=right data-sort-value="0.65" | 650 m || 
|-id=315 bgcolor=#fefefe
| 479315 ||  || — || June 10, 2013 || Mount Lemmon || Mount Lemmon Survey || H || align=right data-sort-value="0.72" | 720 m || 
|-id=316 bgcolor=#fefefe
| 479316 ||  || — || January 30, 2004 || Kitt Peak || Spacewatch || H || align=right data-sort-value="0.49" | 490 m || 
|-id=317 bgcolor=#fefefe
| 479317 ||  || — || August 9, 2013 || Kitt Peak || Spacewatch || Hcritical || align=right data-sort-value="0.62" | 620 m || 
|-id=318 bgcolor=#fefefe
| 479318 ||  || — || October 8, 2008 || Catalina || CSS || H || align=right data-sort-value="0.74" | 740 m || 
|-id=319 bgcolor=#fefefe
| 479319 ||  || — || March 14, 2012 || Catalina || CSS || H || align=right data-sort-value="0.56" | 560 m || 
|-id=320 bgcolor=#fefefe
| 479320 ||  || — || January 20, 2009 || Catalina || CSS || H || align=right data-sort-value="0.71" | 710 m || 
|-id=321 bgcolor=#fefefe
| 479321 ||  || — || May 13, 2004 || Socorro || LINEAR || H || align=right data-sort-value="0.89" | 890 m || 
|-id=322 bgcolor=#fefefe
| 479322 ||  || — || November 27, 2010 || Mount Lemmon || Mount Lemmon Survey || — || align=right data-sort-value="0.58" | 580 m || 
|-id=323 bgcolor=#fefefe
| 479323 ||  || — || September 15, 2006 || Kitt Peak || Spacewatch || — || align=right data-sort-value="0.62" | 620 m || 
|-id=324 bgcolor=#fefefe
| 479324 ||  || — || October 9, 2010 || Mount Lemmon || Mount Lemmon Survey || — || align=right data-sort-value="0.61" | 610 m || 
|-id=325 bgcolor=#FFC2E0
| 479325 ||  || — || October 3, 2013 || Catalina || CSS || APOfast || align=right data-sort-value="0.51" | 510 m || 
|-id=326 bgcolor=#fefefe
| 479326 ||  || — || September 14, 2013 || Mount Lemmon || Mount Lemmon Survey || — || align=right data-sort-value="0.68" | 680 m || 
|-id=327 bgcolor=#fefefe
| 479327 ||  || — || December 30, 2007 || Kitt Peak || Spacewatch || — || align=right data-sort-value="0.68" | 680 m || 
|-id=328 bgcolor=#fefefe
| 479328 ||  || — || October 30, 2010 || Kitt Peak || Spacewatch || — || align=right data-sort-value="0.70" | 700 m || 
|-id=329 bgcolor=#fefefe
| 479329 ||  || — || December 4, 2010 || Mount Lemmon || Mount Lemmon Survey || — || align=right data-sort-value="0.76" | 760 m || 
|-id=330 bgcolor=#fefefe
| 479330 ||  || — || September 18, 2003 || Kitt Peak || Spacewatch || — || align=right data-sort-value="0.62" | 620 m || 
|-id=331 bgcolor=#fefefe
| 479331 ||  || — || October 3, 2013 || Kitt Peak || Spacewatch || — || align=right data-sort-value="0.96" | 960 m || 
|-id=332 bgcolor=#fefefe
| 479332 ||  || — || April 4, 2005 || Catalina || CSS || — || align=right data-sort-value="0.86" | 860 m || 
|-id=333 bgcolor=#fefefe
| 479333 ||  || — || November 21, 2000 || Socorro || LINEAR || H || align=right data-sort-value="0.86" | 860 m || 
|-id=334 bgcolor=#fefefe
| 479334 ||  || — || December 15, 2006 || Kitt Peak || Spacewatch || NYS || align=right data-sort-value="0.55" | 550 m || 
|-id=335 bgcolor=#fefefe
| 479335 ||  || — || February 2, 2008 || Kitt Peak || Spacewatch || — || align=right data-sort-value="0.65" | 650 m || 
|-id=336 bgcolor=#fefefe
| 479336 ||  || — || October 20, 2003 || Kitt Peak || Spacewatch || critical || align=right data-sort-value="0.45" | 450 m || 
|-id=337 bgcolor=#fefefe
| 479337 ||  || — || October 18, 2000 || Kitt Peak || Spacewatch || — || align=right data-sort-value="0.69" | 690 m || 
|-id=338 bgcolor=#fefefe
| 479338 ||  || — || January 8, 2011 || Mount Lemmon || Mount Lemmon Survey || V || align=right data-sort-value="0.52" | 520 m || 
|-id=339 bgcolor=#fefefe
| 479339 ||  || — || October 23, 2006 || Kitt Peak || Spacewatch || V || align=right data-sort-value="0.63" | 630 m || 
|-id=340 bgcolor=#fefefe
| 479340 ||  || — || April 2, 2005 || Kitt Peak || Spacewatch || — || align=right data-sort-value="0.59" | 590 m || 
|-id=341 bgcolor=#fefefe
| 479341 ||  || — || October 7, 2013 || Mount Lemmon || Mount Lemmon Survey || — || align=right data-sort-value="0.54" | 540 m || 
|-id=342 bgcolor=#fefefe
| 479342 ||  || — || November 5, 2007 || Mount Lemmon || Mount Lemmon Survey || — || align=right data-sort-value="0.71" | 710 m || 
|-id=343 bgcolor=#fefefe
| 479343 ||  || — || February 26, 2008 || Mount Lemmon || Mount Lemmon Survey || — || align=right data-sort-value="0.80" | 800 m || 
|-id=344 bgcolor=#fefefe
| 479344 ||  || — || October 4, 2006 || Mount Lemmon || Mount Lemmon Survey || — || align=right data-sort-value="0.75" | 750 m || 
|-id=345 bgcolor=#FFC2E0
| 479345 ||  || — || November 27, 2013 || Haleakala || Pan-STARRS || APO || align=right data-sort-value="0.51" | 510 m || 
|-id=346 bgcolor=#fefefe
| 479346 ||  || — || December 10, 2010 || Mount Lemmon || Mount Lemmon Survey || — || align=right data-sort-value="0.73" | 730 m || 
|-id=347 bgcolor=#fefefe
| 479347 ||  || — || October 22, 2006 || Mount Lemmon || Mount Lemmon Survey || — || align=right data-sort-value="0.58" | 580 m || 
|-id=348 bgcolor=#E9E9E9
| 479348 ||  || — || January 10, 2010 || Siding Spring || SSS || — || align=right | 2.7 km || 
|-id=349 bgcolor=#fefefe
| 479349 ||  || — || October 20, 1998 || Kitt Peak || Spacewatch || — || align=right data-sort-value="0.65" | 650 m || 
|-id=350 bgcolor=#fefefe
| 479350 ||  || — || August 28, 2006 || Kitt Peak || Spacewatch || — || align=right data-sort-value="0.64" | 640 m || 
|-id=351 bgcolor=#fefefe
| 479351 ||  || — || November 28, 2013 || Mount Lemmon || Mount Lemmon Survey || — || align=right data-sort-value="0.95" | 950 m || 
|-id=352 bgcolor=#fefefe
| 479352 ||  || — || December 2, 2010 || Mount Lemmon || Mount Lemmon Survey || — || align=right data-sort-value="0.99" | 990 m || 
|-id=353 bgcolor=#fefefe
| 479353 ||  || — || December 23, 2006 || Mount Lemmon || Mount Lemmon Survey || — || align=right data-sort-value="0.86" | 860 m || 
|-id=354 bgcolor=#fefefe
| 479354 ||  || — || December 10, 2006 || Socorro || LINEAR || — || align=right | 1.4 km || 
|-id=355 bgcolor=#fefefe
| 479355 ||  || — || February 11, 2011 || Mount Lemmon || Mount Lemmon Survey || — || align=right data-sort-value="0.84" | 840 m || 
|-id=356 bgcolor=#E9E9E9
| 479356 ||  || — || October 16, 2003 || Kitt Peak || Spacewatch || — || align=right | 2.1 km || 
|-id=357 bgcolor=#fefefe
| 479357 ||  || — || February 15, 2008 || Siding Spring || SSS || — || align=right | 1.0 km || 
|-id=358 bgcolor=#E9E9E9
| 479358 ||  || — || September 9, 2008 || Kitt Peak || Spacewatch || — || align=right | 1.0 km || 
|-id=359 bgcolor=#fefefe
| 479359 ||  || — || December 30, 2007 || Kitt Peak || Spacewatch || — || align=right data-sort-value="0.79" | 790 m || 
|-id=360 bgcolor=#fefefe
| 479360 ||  || — || October 2, 2009 || Mount Lemmon || Mount Lemmon Survey || — || align=right | 2.2 km || 
|-id=361 bgcolor=#fefefe
| 479361 ||  || — || February 21, 2007 || Mount Lemmon || Mount Lemmon Survey || NYS || align=right data-sort-value="0.66" | 660 m || 
|-id=362 bgcolor=#fefefe
| 479362 ||  || — || December 11, 2006 || Kitt Peak || Spacewatch || — || align=right data-sort-value="0.53" | 530 m || 
|-id=363 bgcolor=#fefefe
| 479363 ||  || — || November 16, 2006 || Kitt Peak || Spacewatch || — || align=right data-sort-value="0.81" | 810 m || 
|-id=364 bgcolor=#fefefe
| 479364 ||  || — || August 29, 2009 || Kitt Peak || Spacewatch || MAS || align=right data-sort-value="0.56" | 560 m || 
|-id=365 bgcolor=#fefefe
| 479365 ||  || — || October 31, 2013 || Mount Lemmon || Mount Lemmon Survey || — || align=right data-sort-value="0.71" | 710 m || 
|-id=366 bgcolor=#fefefe
| 479366 ||  || — || November 16, 2006 || Kitt Peak || Spacewatch || — || align=right data-sort-value="0.62" | 620 m || 
|-id=367 bgcolor=#fefefe
| 479367 ||  || — || December 24, 2006 || Kitt Peak || Spacewatch || — || align=right data-sort-value="0.74" | 740 m || 
|-id=368 bgcolor=#fefefe
| 479368 ||  || — || April 11, 2012 || Mount Lemmon || Mount Lemmon Survey || — || align=right data-sort-value="0.62" | 620 m || 
|-id=369 bgcolor=#fefefe
| 479369 ||  || — || August 28, 1995 || Kitt Peak || Spacewatch || — || align=right data-sort-value="0.67" | 670 m || 
|-id=370 bgcolor=#fefefe
| 479370 ||  || — || February 9, 2007 || Kitt Peak || Spacewatch || MAS || align=right data-sort-value="0.74" | 740 m || 
|-id=371 bgcolor=#fefefe
| 479371 ||  || — || October 14, 2009 || Mount Lemmon || Mount Lemmon Survey || — || align=right data-sort-value="0.94" | 940 m || 
|-id=372 bgcolor=#E9E9E9
| 479372 ||  || — || October 10, 2012 || Mount Lemmon || Mount Lemmon Survey || — || align=right | 1.8 km || 
|-id=373 bgcolor=#fefefe
| 479373 ||  || — || December 21, 2006 || Kitt Peak || Spacewatch || — || align=right data-sort-value="0.70" | 700 m || 
|-id=374 bgcolor=#fefefe
| 479374 ||  || — || January 11, 2011 || Kitt Peak || Spacewatch || — || align=right data-sort-value="0.66" | 660 m || 
|-id=375 bgcolor=#fefefe
| 479375 ||  || — || December 24, 2006 || Kitt Peak || Spacewatch || — || align=right data-sort-value="0.99" | 990 m || 
|-id=376 bgcolor=#fefefe
| 479376 ||  || — || November 26, 2013 || Mount Lemmon || Mount Lemmon Survey || — || align=right data-sort-value="0.93" | 930 m || 
|-id=377 bgcolor=#E9E9E9
| 479377 ||  || — || January 15, 2005 || Kitt Peak || Spacewatch || — || align=right | 1.7 km || 
|-id=378 bgcolor=#fefefe
| 479378 ||  || — || October 17, 2009 || Mount Lemmon || Mount Lemmon Survey || — || align=right data-sort-value="0.81" | 810 m || 
|-id=379 bgcolor=#E9E9E9
| 479379 ||  || — || October 10, 2012 || Mount Lemmon || Mount Lemmon Survey || — || align=right | 2.5 km || 
|-id=380 bgcolor=#E9E9E9
| 479380 ||  || — || April 15, 2010 || Mount Lemmon || Mount Lemmon Survey || DOR || align=right | 2.3 km || 
|-id=381 bgcolor=#fefefe
| 479381 ||  || — || February 25, 2011 || Mount Lemmon || Mount Lemmon Survey || — || align=right data-sort-value="0.76" | 760 m || 
|-id=382 bgcolor=#E9E9E9
| 479382 ||  || — || November 21, 2009 || Mount Lemmon || Mount Lemmon Survey || — || align=right | 1.1 km || 
|-id=383 bgcolor=#fefefe
| 479383 ||  || — || October 4, 2006 || Mount Lemmon || Mount Lemmon Survey || — || align=right data-sort-value="0.54" | 540 m || 
|-id=384 bgcolor=#fefefe
| 479384 ||  || — || October 22, 2006 || Kitt Peak || Spacewatch || — || align=right data-sort-value="0.62" | 620 m || 
|-id=385 bgcolor=#fefefe
| 479385 ||  || — || November 1, 1999 || Kitt Peak || Spacewatch || — || align=right data-sort-value="0.57" | 570 m || 
|-id=386 bgcolor=#fefefe
| 479386 ||  || — || November 14, 1998 || Kitt Peak || Spacewatch || — || align=right data-sort-value="0.72" | 720 m || 
|-id=387 bgcolor=#fefefe
| 479387 ||  || — || July 30, 2008 || Kitt Peak || Spacewatch || — || align=right data-sort-value="0.98" | 980 m || 
|-id=388 bgcolor=#fefefe
| 479388 ||  || — || September 19, 2009 || Mount Lemmon || Mount Lemmon Survey || — || align=right data-sort-value="0.63" | 630 m || 
|-id=389 bgcolor=#fefefe
| 479389 ||  || — || January 31, 2010 || WISE || WISE || — || align=right | 1.3 km || 
|-id=390 bgcolor=#fefefe
| 479390 ||  || — || January 27, 2010 || WISE || WISE || — || align=right | 3.5 km || 
|-id=391 bgcolor=#fefefe
| 479391 ||  || — || November 27, 2009 || Mount Lemmon || Mount Lemmon Survey || — || align=right | 2.0 km || 
|-id=392 bgcolor=#fefefe
| 479392 ||  || — || November 23, 2009 || Mount Lemmon || Mount Lemmon Survey || — || align=right data-sort-value="0.58" | 580 m || 
|-id=393 bgcolor=#fefefe
| 479393 ||  || — || October 20, 2003 || Kitt Peak || Spacewatch || — || align=right data-sort-value="0.64" | 640 m || 
|-id=394 bgcolor=#fefefe
| 479394 ||  || — || October 21, 2009 || Mount Lemmon || Mount Lemmon Survey || — || align=right | 1.1 km || 
|-id=395 bgcolor=#E9E9E9
| 479395 ||  || — || March 16, 2010 || Catalina || CSS || — || align=right | 2.6 km || 
|-id=396 bgcolor=#fefefe
| 479396 ||  || — || December 27, 2006 || Mount Lemmon || Mount Lemmon Survey || MAS || align=right data-sort-value="0.82" | 820 m || 
|-id=397 bgcolor=#fefefe
| 479397 ||  || — || October 21, 2006 || Mount Lemmon || Mount Lemmon Survey || — || align=right data-sort-value="0.59" | 590 m || 
|-id=398 bgcolor=#fefefe
| 479398 ||  || — || March 2, 2011 || Kitt Peak || Spacewatch || — || align=right data-sort-value="0.77" | 770 m || 
|-id=399 bgcolor=#E9E9E9
| 479399 ||  || — || November 2, 2013 || Mount Lemmon || Mount Lemmon Survey || (5) || align=right data-sort-value="0.88" | 880 m || 
|-id=400 bgcolor=#fefefe
| 479400 ||  || — || August 16, 2009 || Kitt Peak || Spacewatch || — || align=right data-sort-value="0.61" | 610 m || 
|}

479401–479500 

|-bgcolor=#fefefe
| 479401 ||  || — || January 10, 2007 || Mount Lemmon || Mount Lemmon Survey || — || align=right data-sort-value="0.71" | 710 m || 
|-id=402 bgcolor=#fefefe
| 479402 ||  || — || February 23, 2007 || Kitt Peak || Spacewatch || — || align=right data-sort-value="0.71" | 710 m || 
|-id=403 bgcolor=#fefefe
| 479403 ||  || — || December 18, 2003 || Socorro || LINEAR || — || align=right data-sort-value="0.81" | 810 m || 
|-id=404 bgcolor=#fefefe
| 479404 ||  || — || September 22, 2009 || Kitt Peak || Spacewatch || — || align=right data-sort-value="0.73" | 730 m || 
|-id=405 bgcolor=#fefefe
| 479405 ||  || — || February 21, 2007 || Mount Lemmon || Mount Lemmon Survey || — || align=right data-sort-value="0.75" | 750 m || 
|-id=406 bgcolor=#E9E9E9
| 479406 ||  || — || April 30, 2006 || Kitt Peak || Spacewatch || — || align=right | 1.8 km || 
|-id=407 bgcolor=#E9E9E9
| 479407 ||  || — || January 15, 2010 || Catalina || CSS || (194) || align=right | 2.1 km || 
|-id=408 bgcolor=#fefefe
| 479408 ||  || — || February 25, 2003 || Campo Imperatore || CINEOS || — || align=right data-sort-value="0.69" | 690 m || 
|-id=409 bgcolor=#E9E9E9
| 479409 ||  || — || January 7, 2010 || Kitt Peak || Spacewatch || MAR || align=right | 1.0 km || 
|-id=410 bgcolor=#E9E9E9
| 479410 ||  || — || September 24, 2008 || Mount Lemmon || Mount Lemmon Survey || — || align=right | 1.6 km || 
|-id=411 bgcolor=#fefefe
| 479411 ||  || — || November 16, 2009 || Mount Lemmon || Mount Lemmon Survey || V || align=right data-sort-value="0.54" | 540 m || 
|-id=412 bgcolor=#fefefe
| 479412 ||  || — || August 25, 2004 || Kitt Peak || Spacewatch || — || align=right data-sort-value="0.94" | 940 m || 
|-id=413 bgcolor=#E9E9E9
| 479413 ||  || — || June 3, 2011 || Mount Lemmon || Mount Lemmon Survey || EUN || align=right | 1.3 km || 
|-id=414 bgcolor=#fefefe
| 479414 ||  || — || December 15, 2006 || Kitt Peak || Spacewatch || — || align=right data-sort-value="0.63" | 630 m || 
|-id=415 bgcolor=#d6d6d6
| 479415 ||  || — || April 11, 2010 || WISE || WISE || LIX || align=right | 3.4 km || 
|-id=416 bgcolor=#fefefe
| 479416 ||  || — || February 21, 2007 || Mount Lemmon || Mount Lemmon Survey || — || align=right data-sort-value="0.78" | 780 m || 
|-id=417 bgcolor=#fefefe
| 479417 ||  || — || October 9, 2005 || Kitt Peak || Spacewatch || — || align=right data-sort-value="0.79" | 790 m || 
|-id=418 bgcolor=#fefefe
| 479418 ||  || — || December 21, 2006 || Kitt Peak || Spacewatch || — || align=right data-sort-value="0.60" | 600 m || 
|-id=419 bgcolor=#fefefe
| 479419 ||  || — || December 21, 2006 || Mount Lemmon || Mount Lemmon Survey || — || align=right data-sort-value="0.56" | 560 m || 
|-id=420 bgcolor=#fefefe
| 479420 ||  || — || February 8, 2007 || Kitt Peak || Spacewatch || NYS || align=right data-sort-value="0.62" | 620 m || 
|-id=421 bgcolor=#fefefe
| 479421 ||  || — || October 30, 2005 || Kitt Peak || Spacewatch || — || align=right data-sort-value="0.90" | 900 m || 
|-id=422 bgcolor=#fefefe
| 479422 ||  || — || September 24, 2005 || Kitt Peak || Spacewatch || NYS || align=right data-sort-value="0.72" | 720 m || 
|-id=423 bgcolor=#fefefe
| 479423 ||  || — || October 5, 2005 || Kitt Peak || Spacewatch || MAS || align=right data-sort-value="0.63" | 630 m || 
|-id=424 bgcolor=#fefefe
| 479424 ||  || — || November 27, 2006 || Mount Lemmon || Mount Lemmon Survey || — || align=right data-sort-value="0.66" | 660 m || 
|-id=425 bgcolor=#fefefe
| 479425 ||  || — || April 26, 2011 || Mount Lemmon || Mount Lemmon Survey || — || align=right data-sort-value="0.79" | 790 m || 
|-id=426 bgcolor=#fefefe
| 479426 ||  || — || October 26, 2009 || Kitt Peak || Spacewatch || V || align=right data-sort-value="0.56" | 560 m || 
|-id=427 bgcolor=#fefefe
| 479427 ||  || — || October 24, 2009 || Kitt Peak || Spacewatch || — || align=right data-sort-value="0.69" | 690 m || 
|-id=428 bgcolor=#fefefe
| 479428 ||  || — || April 24, 2007 || Mount Lemmon || Mount Lemmon Survey || — || align=right | 1.0 km || 
|-id=429 bgcolor=#fefefe
| 479429 ||  || — || September 29, 2005 || Mount Lemmon || Mount Lemmon Survey || — || align=right data-sort-value="0.59" | 590 m || 
|-id=430 bgcolor=#E9E9E9
| 479430 ||  || — || December 28, 2013 || Kitt Peak || Spacewatch || — || align=right | 1.1 km || 
|-id=431 bgcolor=#fefefe
| 479431 ||  || — || February 8, 2007 || Kitt Peak || Spacewatch || — || align=right data-sort-value="0.54" | 540 m || 
|-id=432 bgcolor=#fefefe
| 479432 ||  || — || March 28, 2011 || Mount Lemmon || Mount Lemmon Survey || — || align=right data-sort-value="0.68" | 680 m || 
|-id=433 bgcolor=#fefefe
| 479433 ||  || — || December 4, 2005 || Kitt Peak || Spacewatch || — || align=right | 1.8 km || 
|-id=434 bgcolor=#fefefe
| 479434 ||  || — || September 18, 2009 || Kitt Peak || Spacewatch || NYS || align=right data-sort-value="0.59" | 590 m || 
|-id=435 bgcolor=#fefefe
| 479435 ||  || — || August 28, 2009 || Kitt Peak || Spacewatch || — || align=right data-sort-value="0.73" | 730 m || 
|-id=436 bgcolor=#fefefe
| 479436 ||  || — || March 12, 2007 || Mount Lemmon || Mount Lemmon Survey || MAS || align=right data-sort-value="0.66" | 660 m || 
|-id=437 bgcolor=#fefefe
| 479437 ||  || — || August 28, 2005 || Kitt Peak || Spacewatch || — || align=right data-sort-value="0.70" | 700 m || 
|-id=438 bgcolor=#d6d6d6
| 479438 ||  || — || June 13, 2005 || Mount Lemmon || Mount Lemmon Survey || — || align=right | 3.5 km || 
|-id=439 bgcolor=#fefefe
| 479439 ||  || — || November 4, 2005 || Catalina || CSS || — || align=right data-sort-value="0.94" | 940 m || 
|-id=440 bgcolor=#E9E9E9
| 479440 ||  || — || December 24, 2013 || Mount Lemmon || Mount Lemmon Survey || MAR || align=right | 1.1 km || 
|-id=441 bgcolor=#fefefe
| 479441 ||  || — || December 14, 2006 || Kitt Peak || Spacewatch || V || align=right data-sort-value="0.72" | 720 m || 
|-id=442 bgcolor=#fefefe
| 479442 ||  || — || April 2, 2011 || Kitt Peak || Spacewatch || — || align=right data-sort-value="0.89" | 890 m || 
|-id=443 bgcolor=#E9E9E9
| 479443 ||  || — || September 30, 2003 || Kitt Peak || Spacewatch || — || align=right | 2.2 km || 
|-id=444 bgcolor=#fefefe
| 479444 ||  || — || December 28, 2013 || Kitt Peak || Spacewatch || V || align=right data-sort-value="0.54" | 540 m || 
|-id=445 bgcolor=#fefefe
| 479445 ||  || — || April 18, 2007 || Mount Lemmon || Mount Lemmon Survey || MAS || align=right data-sort-value="0.71" | 710 m || 
|-id=446 bgcolor=#fefefe
| 479446 ||  || — || August 30, 2005 || Kitt Peak || Spacewatch || NYS || align=right data-sort-value="0.58" | 580 m || 
|-id=447 bgcolor=#fefefe
| 479447 ||  || — || September 26, 2005 || Kitt Peak || Spacewatch || MAS || align=right data-sort-value="0.74" | 740 m || 
|-id=448 bgcolor=#fefefe
| 479448 ||  || — || April 25, 2004 || Kitt Peak || Spacewatch || — || align=right data-sort-value="0.84" | 840 m || 
|-id=449 bgcolor=#fefefe
| 479449 ||  || — || January 27, 2007 || Kitt Peak || Spacewatch || MAS || align=right data-sort-value="0.48" | 480 m || 
|-id=450 bgcolor=#fefefe
| 479450 ||  || — || September 15, 2009 || Kitt Peak || Spacewatch || — || align=right data-sort-value="0.61" | 610 m || 
|-id=451 bgcolor=#fefefe
| 479451 ||  || — || March 13, 2010 || WISE || WISE || — || align=right | 2.3 km || 
|-id=452 bgcolor=#fefefe
| 479452 ||  || — || December 15, 2006 || Mount Lemmon || Mount Lemmon Survey || — || align=right data-sort-value="0.71" | 710 m || 
|-id=453 bgcolor=#fefefe
| 479453 ||  || — || December 13, 2006 || Kitt Peak || Spacewatch || — || align=right data-sort-value="0.61" | 610 m || 
|-id=454 bgcolor=#fefefe
| 479454 ||  || — || December 13, 1998 || Kitt Peak || Spacewatch || — || align=right data-sort-value="0.91" | 910 m || 
|-id=455 bgcolor=#fefefe
| 479455 ||  || — || December 30, 2013 || Mount Lemmon || Mount Lemmon Survey || V || align=right data-sort-value="0.65" | 650 m || 
|-id=456 bgcolor=#fefefe
| 479456 ||  || — || November 2, 2006 || Mount Lemmon || Mount Lemmon Survey || — || align=right data-sort-value="0.72" | 720 m || 
|-id=457 bgcolor=#fefefe
| 479457 ||  || — || November 10, 2006 || Kitt Peak || Spacewatch || — || align=right data-sort-value="0.61" | 610 m || 
|-id=458 bgcolor=#fefefe
| 479458 ||  || — || December 21, 2005 || Kitt Peak || Spacewatch || — || align=right data-sort-value="0.94" | 940 m || 
|-id=459 bgcolor=#fefefe
| 479459 ||  || — || December 8, 2006 || Socorro || LINEAR || — || align=right | 1.3 km || 
|-id=460 bgcolor=#fefefe
| 479460 ||  || — || April 24, 2011 || Mount Lemmon || Mount Lemmon Survey || — || align=right data-sort-value="0.97" | 970 m || 
|-id=461 bgcolor=#fefefe
| 479461 ||  || — || February 16, 2004 || Kitt Peak || Spacewatch || — || align=right data-sort-value="0.64" | 640 m || 
|-id=462 bgcolor=#fefefe
| 479462 ||  || — || December 31, 2013 || Mount Lemmon || Mount Lemmon Survey || BAP || align=right data-sort-value="0.99" | 990 m || 
|-id=463 bgcolor=#fefefe
| 479463 ||  || — || January 28, 2004 || Kitt Peak || Spacewatch || — || align=right data-sort-value="0.84" | 840 m || 
|-id=464 bgcolor=#fefefe
| 479464 ||  || — || September 23, 2009 || Mount Lemmon || Mount Lemmon Survey || V || align=right data-sort-value="0.48" | 480 m || 
|-id=465 bgcolor=#E9E9E9
| 479465 ||  || — || May 13, 2011 || Mount Lemmon || Mount Lemmon Survey || — || align=right | 1.1 km || 
|-id=466 bgcolor=#fefefe
| 479466 ||  || — || January 27, 2007 || Kitt Peak || Spacewatch || — || align=right data-sort-value="0.68" | 680 m || 
|-id=467 bgcolor=#fefefe
| 479467 ||  || — || February 8, 2011 || Mount Lemmon || Mount Lemmon Survey || — || align=right data-sort-value="0.87" | 870 m || 
|-id=468 bgcolor=#fefefe
| 479468 ||  || — || August 22, 1995 || Kitt Peak || Spacewatch || — || align=right data-sort-value="0.71" | 710 m || 
|-id=469 bgcolor=#d6d6d6
| 479469 ||  || — || May 16, 2010 || WISE || WISE || — || align=right | 3.2 km || 
|-id=470 bgcolor=#fefefe
| 479470 ||  || — || October 24, 2009 || Kitt Peak || Spacewatch || NYS || align=right data-sort-value="0.47" | 470 m || 
|-id=471 bgcolor=#fefefe
| 479471 ||  || — || December 14, 2003 || Kitt Peak || Spacewatch || — || align=right data-sort-value="0.77" | 770 m || 
|-id=472 bgcolor=#E9E9E9
| 479472 ||  || — || December 30, 2005 || Mount Lemmon || Mount Lemmon Survey || — || align=right data-sort-value="0.80" | 800 m || 
|-id=473 bgcolor=#fefefe
| 479473 ||  || — || November 16, 2006 || Kitt Peak || Spacewatch || — || align=right data-sort-value="0.57" | 570 m || 
|-id=474 bgcolor=#fefefe
| 479474 ||  || — || November 25, 2009 || Kitt Peak || Spacewatch || — || align=right data-sort-value="0.71" | 710 m || 
|-id=475 bgcolor=#fefefe
| 479475 ||  || — || February 26, 2007 || Mount Lemmon || Mount Lemmon Survey || — || align=right data-sort-value="0.83" | 830 m || 
|-id=476 bgcolor=#fefefe
| 479476 ||  || — || January 25, 2007 || Kitt Peak || Spacewatch || — || align=right data-sort-value="0.53" | 530 m || 
|-id=477 bgcolor=#E9E9E9
| 479477 ||  || — || January 6, 2010 || Kitt Peak || Spacewatch || (5) || align=right data-sort-value="0.68" | 680 m || 
|-id=478 bgcolor=#fefefe
| 479478 ||  || — || March 26, 2011 || Mount Lemmon || Mount Lemmon Survey || — || align=right data-sort-value="0.80" | 800 m || 
|-id=479 bgcolor=#E9E9E9
| 479479 ||  || — || May 11, 2010 || WISE || WISE || — || align=right | 1.3 km || 
|-id=480 bgcolor=#fefefe
| 479480 ||  || — || September 19, 2001 || Socorro || LINEAR || NYS || align=right data-sort-value="0.67" | 670 m || 
|-id=481 bgcolor=#E9E9E9
| 479481 ||  || — || March 14, 2010 || Catalina || CSS || EUN || align=right | 1.4 km || 
|-id=482 bgcolor=#E9E9E9
| 479482 ||  || — || October 1, 2008 || Kitt Peak || Spacewatch || — || align=right | 1.1 km || 
|-id=483 bgcolor=#fefefe
| 479483 ||  || — || November 9, 1999 || Socorro || LINEAR || — || align=right data-sort-value="0.70" | 700 m || 
|-id=484 bgcolor=#E9E9E9
| 479484 ||  || — || November 1, 2013 || Mount Lemmon || Mount Lemmon Survey || EUN || align=right | 1.2 km || 
|-id=485 bgcolor=#fefefe
| 479485 ||  || — || November 29, 1999 || Kitt Peak || Spacewatch || — || align=right data-sort-value="0.81" | 810 m || 
|-id=486 bgcolor=#E9E9E9
| 479486 ||  || — || June 16, 2010 || WISE || WISE || — || align=right | 2.4 km || 
|-id=487 bgcolor=#E9E9E9
| 479487 ||  || — || November 2, 2008 || Mount Lemmon || Mount Lemmon Survey || — || align=right | 1.4 km || 
|-id=488 bgcolor=#fefefe
| 479488 ||  || — || December 13, 2006 || Kitt Peak || Spacewatch || — || align=right data-sort-value="0.88" | 880 m || 
|-id=489 bgcolor=#fefefe
| 479489 ||  || — || February 16, 2007 || Mount Lemmon || Mount Lemmon Survey || V || align=right data-sort-value="0.67" | 670 m || 
|-id=490 bgcolor=#E9E9E9
| 479490 ||  || — || February 14, 2010 || Mount Lemmon || Mount Lemmon Survey || — || align=right | 1.3 km || 
|-id=491 bgcolor=#fefefe
| 479491 ||  || — || September 14, 2006 || Kitt Peak || Spacewatch || — || align=right data-sort-value="0.56" | 560 m || 
|-id=492 bgcolor=#fefefe
| 479492 ||  || — || December 24, 2013 || Mount Lemmon || Mount Lemmon Survey || — || align=right data-sort-value="0.85" | 850 m || 
|-id=493 bgcolor=#E9E9E9
| 479493 ||  || — || November 28, 2013 || Mount Lemmon || Mount Lemmon Survey || EUN || align=right data-sort-value="0.97" | 970 m || 
|-id=494 bgcolor=#E9E9E9
| 479494 ||  || — || September 13, 2007 || Mount Lemmon || Mount Lemmon Survey || — || align=right | 1.5 km || 
|-id=495 bgcolor=#E9E9E9
| 479495 ||  || — || February 15, 2010 || Kitt Peak || Spacewatch || — || align=right | 1.5 km || 
|-id=496 bgcolor=#E9E9E9
| 479496 ||  || — || November 27, 2009 || Mount Lemmon || Mount Lemmon Survey || — || align=right | 1.5 km || 
|-id=497 bgcolor=#E9E9E9
| 479497 ||  || — || January 10, 1997 || Kitt Peak || Spacewatch || — || align=right | 1.8 km || 
|-id=498 bgcolor=#E9E9E9
| 479498 ||  || — || March 16, 2005 || Kitt Peak || Spacewatch || — || align=right | 2.1 km || 
|-id=499 bgcolor=#fefefe
| 479499 ||  || — || January 27, 2007 || Mount Lemmon || Mount Lemmon Survey || — || align=right data-sort-value="0.75" | 750 m || 
|-id=500 bgcolor=#fefefe
| 479500 ||  || — || September 18, 2006 || Kitt Peak || Spacewatch || — || align=right data-sort-value="0.65" | 650 m || 
|}

479501–479600 

|-bgcolor=#fefefe
| 479501 ||  || — || February 18, 2007 || Catalina || CSS || — || align=right | 1.3 km || 
|-id=502 bgcolor=#E9E9E9
| 479502 ||  || — || October 8, 2008 || Mount Lemmon || Mount Lemmon Survey || JUN || align=right | 1.0 km || 
|-id=503 bgcolor=#E9E9E9
| 479503 ||  || — || November 28, 2013 || Mount Lemmon || Mount Lemmon Survey || — || align=right | 2.1 km || 
|-id=504 bgcolor=#fefefe
| 479504 ||  || — || January 14, 2011 || Mount Lemmon || Mount Lemmon Survey || — || align=right | 1.1 km || 
|-id=505 bgcolor=#fefefe
| 479505 ||  || — || September 19, 2006 || Kitt Peak || Spacewatch || — || align=right data-sort-value="0.68" | 680 m || 
|-id=506 bgcolor=#fefefe
| 479506 ||  || — || March 10, 2007 || Mount Lemmon || Mount Lemmon Survey || MAS || align=right data-sort-value="0.58" | 580 m || 
|-id=507 bgcolor=#E9E9E9
| 479507 ||  || — || December 31, 2013 || Kitt Peak || Spacewatch || — || align=right | 2.2 km || 
|-id=508 bgcolor=#fefefe
| 479508 ||  || — || September 14, 2005 || Kitt Peak || Spacewatch || — || align=right data-sort-value="0.75" | 750 m || 
|-id=509 bgcolor=#fefefe
| 479509 ||  || — || December 25, 2006 || Kitt Peak || Spacewatch || — || align=right data-sort-value="0.72" | 720 m || 
|-id=510 bgcolor=#E9E9E9
| 479510 ||  || — || October 23, 2012 || Mount Lemmon || Mount Lemmon Survey || — || align=right | 1.9 km || 
|-id=511 bgcolor=#E9E9E9
| 479511 ||  || — || March 2, 1998 || Kitt Peak || Spacewatch || — || align=right | 2.5 km || 
|-id=512 bgcolor=#fefefe
| 479512 ||  || — || November 19, 2006 || Catalina || CSS || — || align=right data-sort-value="0.68" | 680 m || 
|-id=513 bgcolor=#E9E9E9
| 479513 ||  || — || December 4, 2008 || Kitt Peak || Spacewatch || — || align=right | 2.1 km || 
|-id=514 bgcolor=#fefefe
| 479514 ||  || — || December 28, 2005 || Kitt Peak || Spacewatch || — || align=right data-sort-value="0.86" | 860 m || 
|-id=515 bgcolor=#E9E9E9
| 479515 ||  || — || January 16, 2005 || Kitt Peak || Spacewatch || — || align=right | 2.2 km || 
|-id=516 bgcolor=#E9E9E9
| 479516 ||  || — || January 9, 2014 || Mount Lemmon || Mount Lemmon Survey || — || align=right | 1.1 km || 
|-id=517 bgcolor=#E9E9E9
| 479517 ||  || — || October 5, 2004 || Kitt Peak || Spacewatch || — || align=right | 1.0 km || 
|-id=518 bgcolor=#fefefe
| 479518 ||  || — || October 24, 2005 || Kitt Peak || Spacewatch || — || align=right data-sort-value="0.71" | 710 m || 
|-id=519 bgcolor=#fefefe
| 479519 ||  || — || November 21, 2006 || Mount Lemmon || Mount Lemmon Survey || NYS || align=right data-sort-value="0.52" | 520 m || 
|-id=520 bgcolor=#fefefe
| 479520 ||  || — || September 3, 2008 || Kitt Peak || Spacewatch || — || align=right | 1.1 km || 
|-id=521 bgcolor=#fefefe
| 479521 ||  || — || January 28, 2007 || Kitt Peak || Spacewatch || — || align=right data-sort-value="0.66" | 660 m || 
|-id=522 bgcolor=#E9E9E9
| 479522 ||  || — || February 14, 2010 || Mount Lemmon || Mount Lemmon Survey || — || align=right | 1.2 km || 
|-id=523 bgcolor=#d6d6d6
| 479523 ||  || — || December 22, 2008 || Kitt Peak || Spacewatch || — || align=right | 2.3 km || 
|-id=524 bgcolor=#d6d6d6
| 479524 ||  || — || January 1, 2014 || Mount Lemmon || Mount Lemmon Survey || — || align=right | 3.0 km || 
|-id=525 bgcolor=#E9E9E9
| 479525 ||  || — || February 2, 2006 || Mount Lemmon || Mount Lemmon Survey || — || align=right | 1.1 km || 
|-id=526 bgcolor=#fefefe
| 479526 ||  || — || January 7, 2010 || Kitt Peak || Spacewatch || — || align=right | 1.6 km || 
|-id=527 bgcolor=#fefefe
| 479527 ||  || — || September 20, 2009 || Kitt Peak || Spacewatch || — || align=right data-sort-value="0.64" | 640 m || 
|-id=528 bgcolor=#fefefe
| 479528 ||  || — || December 30, 2013 || Mount Lemmon || Mount Lemmon Survey || — || align=right data-sort-value="0.72" | 720 m || 
|-id=529 bgcolor=#fefefe
| 479529 ||  || — || October 25, 2005 || Kitt Peak || Spacewatch || — || align=right data-sort-value="0.75" | 750 m || 
|-id=530 bgcolor=#fefefe
| 479530 ||  || — || March 26, 2007 || Kitt Peak || Spacewatch || — || align=right data-sort-value="0.79" | 790 m || 
|-id=531 bgcolor=#fefefe
| 479531 ||  || — || May 27, 2011 || Kitt Peak || Spacewatch || V || align=right data-sort-value="0.71" | 710 m || 
|-id=532 bgcolor=#d6d6d6
| 479532 ||  || — || March 5, 2008 || Mount Lemmon || Mount Lemmon Survey || 7:4 || align=right | 3.7 km || 
|-id=533 bgcolor=#d6d6d6
| 479533 ||  || — || February 19, 2009 || Catalina || CSS || — || align=right | 3.8 km || 
|-id=534 bgcolor=#E9E9E9
| 479534 ||  || — || November 13, 2012 || Mount Lemmon || Mount Lemmon Survey || — || align=right | 1.6 km || 
|-id=535 bgcolor=#fefefe
| 479535 ||  || — || December 20, 2009 || Kitt Peak || Spacewatch || V || align=right data-sort-value="0.75" | 750 m || 
|-id=536 bgcolor=#fefefe
| 479536 ||  || — || November 22, 2005 || Kitt Peak || Spacewatch || — || align=right data-sort-value="0.75" | 750 m || 
|-id=537 bgcolor=#fefefe
| 479537 ||  || — || November 25, 2005 || Mount Lemmon || Mount Lemmon Survey || MAS || align=right data-sort-value="0.71" | 710 m || 
|-id=538 bgcolor=#fefefe
| 479538 ||  || — || January 9, 2007 || Kitt Peak || Spacewatch || — || align=right data-sort-value="0.80" | 800 m || 
|-id=539 bgcolor=#E9E9E9
| 479539 ||  || — || September 25, 2008 || Kitt Peak || Spacewatch || — || align=right | 1.3 km || 
|-id=540 bgcolor=#E9E9E9
| 479540 ||  || — || September 22, 2008 || Mount Lemmon || Mount Lemmon Survey || — || align=right | 1.1 km || 
|-id=541 bgcolor=#fefefe
| 479541 ||  || — || October 7, 2005 || Kitt Peak || Spacewatch || NYS || align=right data-sort-value="0.69" | 690 m || 
|-id=542 bgcolor=#E9E9E9
| 479542 ||  || — || September 17, 2012 || Mount Lemmon || Mount Lemmon Survey || — || align=right | 1.7 km || 
|-id=543 bgcolor=#fefefe
| 479543 ||  || — || December 10, 2005 || Kitt Peak || Spacewatch || — || align=right data-sort-value="0.80" | 800 m || 
|-id=544 bgcolor=#fefefe
| 479544 ||  || — || December 15, 2006 || Kitt Peak || Spacewatch || — || align=right data-sort-value="0.66" | 660 m || 
|-id=545 bgcolor=#fefefe
| 479545 ||  || — || December 25, 2006 || Kitt Peak || Spacewatch || V || align=right data-sort-value="0.71" | 710 m || 
|-id=546 bgcolor=#fefefe
| 479546 ||  || — || February 21, 2007 || Mount Lemmon || Mount Lemmon Survey || — || align=right data-sort-value="0.74" | 740 m || 
|-id=547 bgcolor=#E9E9E9
| 479547 ||  || — || January 11, 2010 || Kitt Peak || Spacewatch || — || align=right data-sort-value="0.74" | 740 m || 
|-id=548 bgcolor=#E9E9E9
| 479548 ||  || — || January 7, 2010 || Kitt Peak || Spacewatch || — || align=right | 2.2 km || 
|-id=549 bgcolor=#fefefe
| 479549 ||  || — || January 24, 2007 || Catalina || CSS || — || align=right data-sort-value="0.76" | 760 m || 
|-id=550 bgcolor=#fefefe
| 479550 ||  || — || January 10, 2007 || Mount Lemmon || Mount Lemmon Survey || — || align=right data-sort-value="0.63" | 630 m || 
|-id=551 bgcolor=#fefefe
| 479551 ||  || — || December 21, 2006 || Mount Lemmon || Mount Lemmon Survey || — || align=right data-sort-value="0.62" | 620 m || 
|-id=552 bgcolor=#fefefe
| 479552 ||  || — || November 9, 2009 || Kitt Peak || Spacewatch || — || align=right | 1.1 km || 
|-id=553 bgcolor=#fefefe
| 479553 Garyzema ||  ||  || December 20, 2009 || Mount Lemmon || Mount Lemmon Survey || — || align=right | 2.0 km || 
|-id=554 bgcolor=#E9E9E9
| 479554 ||  || — || December 13, 2013 || Mount Lemmon || Mount Lemmon Survey || — || align=right | 1.0 km || 
|-id=555 bgcolor=#E9E9E9
| 479555 ||  || — || March 15, 2010 || Catalina || CSS || — || align=right | 1.6 km || 
|-id=556 bgcolor=#E9E9E9
| 479556 ||  || — || October 9, 2008 || Mount Lemmon || Mount Lemmon Survey || — || align=right | 2.1 km || 
|-id=557 bgcolor=#fefefe
| 479557 ||  || — || May 6, 2003 || Kitt Peak || Spacewatch || — || align=right data-sort-value="0.91" | 910 m || 
|-id=558 bgcolor=#E9E9E9
| 479558 ||  || — || October 11, 2012 || Mount Lemmon || Mount Lemmon Survey || — || align=right | 2.6 km || 
|-id=559 bgcolor=#E9E9E9
| 479559 ||  || — || August 1, 1997 || Caussols || ODAS || — || align=right | 2.6 km || 
|-id=560 bgcolor=#fefefe
| 479560 ||  || — || March 26, 2003 || Kitt Peak || Spacewatch || — || align=right data-sort-value="0.87" | 870 m || 
|-id=561 bgcolor=#fefefe
| 479561 ||  || — || March 15, 2007 || Kitt Peak || Spacewatch || NYS || align=right data-sort-value="0.61" | 610 m || 
|-id=562 bgcolor=#fefefe
| 479562 ||  || — || December 27, 2006 || Kitt Peak || Spacewatch || — || align=right data-sort-value="0.68" | 680 m || 
|-id=563 bgcolor=#E9E9E9
| 479563 ||  || — || May 17, 2010 || WISE || WISE || — || align=right | 3.7 km || 
|-id=564 bgcolor=#fefefe
| 479564 ||  || — || April 28, 2011 || Mount Lemmon || Mount Lemmon Survey || — || align=right data-sort-value="0.82" | 820 m || 
|-id=565 bgcolor=#fefefe
| 479565 ||  || — || May 23, 2011 || Mount Lemmon || Mount Lemmon Survey || — || align=right data-sort-value="0.76" | 760 m || 
|-id=566 bgcolor=#fefefe
| 479566 ||  || — || December 20, 2009 || Mount Lemmon || Mount Lemmon Survey || — || align=right data-sort-value="0.77" | 770 m || 
|-id=567 bgcolor=#E9E9E9
| 479567 ||  || — || September 7, 2004 || Kitt Peak || Spacewatch || — || align=right data-sort-value="0.81" | 810 m || 
|-id=568 bgcolor=#d6d6d6
| 479568 ||  || — || September 16, 2006 || Catalina || CSS || — || align=right | 3.4 km || 
|-id=569 bgcolor=#E9E9E9
| 479569 ||  || — || February 10, 2010 || Kitt Peak || Spacewatch || — || align=right data-sort-value="0.98" | 980 m || 
|-id=570 bgcolor=#fefefe
| 479570 ||  || — || December 25, 2009 || Kitt Peak || Spacewatch || — || align=right data-sort-value="0.94" | 940 m || 
|-id=571 bgcolor=#E9E9E9
| 479571 ||  || — || May 2, 2010 || WISE || WISE || — || align=right | 2.1 km || 
|-id=572 bgcolor=#d6d6d6
| 479572 ||  || — || February 22, 2009 || Siding Spring || SSS || — || align=right | 3.7 km || 
|-id=573 bgcolor=#fefefe
| 479573 ||  || — || October 29, 2005 || Kitt Peak || Spacewatch || — || align=right data-sort-value="0.60" | 600 m || 
|-id=574 bgcolor=#fefefe
| 479574 ||  || — || September 18, 2012 || Mount Lemmon || Mount Lemmon Survey || — || align=right data-sort-value="0.98" | 980 m || 
|-id=575 bgcolor=#E9E9E9
| 479575 ||  || — || April 15, 1997 || Kitt Peak || Spacewatch || — || align=right | 1.4 km || 
|-id=576 bgcolor=#E9E9E9
| 479576 ||  || — || September 21, 2008 || Kitt Peak || Spacewatch || — || align=right | 1.4 km || 
|-id=577 bgcolor=#E9E9E9
| 479577 ||  || — || October 8, 2008 || Mount Lemmon || Mount Lemmon Survey || (5) || align=right | 1.1 km || 
|-id=578 bgcolor=#E9E9E9
| 479578 ||  || — || September 17, 2012 || Mount Lemmon || Mount Lemmon Survey || JUN || align=right | 1.1 km || 
|-id=579 bgcolor=#fefefe
| 479579 ||  || — || November 18, 2009 || Mount Lemmon || Mount Lemmon Survey || — || align=right data-sort-value="0.76" | 760 m || 
|-id=580 bgcolor=#E9E9E9
| 479580 ||  || — || September 18, 2003 || Kitt Peak || Spacewatch || MRX || align=right | 1.1 km || 
|-id=581 bgcolor=#d6d6d6
| 479581 ||  || — || February 11, 2008 || Mount Lemmon || Mount Lemmon Survey || — || align=right | 3.1 km || 
|-id=582 bgcolor=#E9E9E9
| 479582 ||  || — || February 3, 2000 || Kitt Peak || Spacewatch || — || align=right | 2.3 km || 
|-id=583 bgcolor=#fefefe
| 479583 ||  || — || October 24, 2005 || Kitt Peak || Spacewatch || — || align=right data-sort-value="0.74" | 740 m || 
|-id=584 bgcolor=#fefefe
| 479584 ||  || — || December 10, 2006 || Kitt Peak || Spacewatch || — || align=right data-sort-value="0.68" | 680 m || 
|-id=585 bgcolor=#E9E9E9
| 479585 ||  || — || January 16, 2005 || Kitt Peak || Spacewatch || — || align=right | 2.4 km || 
|-id=586 bgcolor=#E9E9E9
| 479586 ||  || — || September 15, 2012 || Kitt Peak || Spacewatch || — || align=right | 1.6 km || 
|-id=587 bgcolor=#fefefe
| 479587 ||  || — || January 13, 1996 || Kitt Peak || Spacewatch || V || align=right data-sort-value="0.77" | 770 m || 
|-id=588 bgcolor=#E9E9E9
| 479588 ||  || — || March 25, 2006 || Kitt Peak || Spacewatch || (5) || align=right | 1.0 km || 
|-id=589 bgcolor=#fefefe
| 479589 ||  || — || April 20, 2007 || Kitt Peak || Spacewatch || — || align=right data-sort-value="0.76" | 760 m || 
|-id=590 bgcolor=#E9E9E9
| 479590 ||  || — || June 1, 2010 || WISE || WISE || — || align=right | 1.1 km || 
|-id=591 bgcolor=#fefefe
| 479591 ||  || — || April 22, 2007 || Mount Lemmon || Mount Lemmon Survey || NYS || align=right data-sort-value="0.67" | 670 m || 
|-id=592 bgcolor=#d6d6d6
| 479592 ||  || — || January 16, 2008 || Mount Lemmon || Mount Lemmon Survey || — || align=right | 4.9 km || 
|-id=593 bgcolor=#E9E9E9
| 479593 ||  || — || September 9, 2007 || Kitt Peak || Spacewatch || — || align=right | 1.7 km || 
|-id=594 bgcolor=#fefefe
| 479594 ||  || — || March 21, 2010 || WISE || WISE || — || align=right | 2.2 km || 
|-id=595 bgcolor=#d6d6d6
| 479595 ||  || — || December 16, 2007 || Kitt Peak || Spacewatch || — || align=right | 2.9 km || 
|-id=596 bgcolor=#E9E9E9
| 479596 ||  || — || January 3, 2014 || Mount Lemmon || Mount Lemmon Survey || — || align=right | 2.5 km || 
|-id=597 bgcolor=#fefefe
| 479597 ||  || — || October 1, 2005 || Mount Lemmon || Mount Lemmon Survey || — || align=right data-sort-value="0.71" | 710 m || 
|-id=598 bgcolor=#E9E9E9
| 479598 ||  || — || January 17, 2005 || Kitt Peak || Spacewatch || — || align=right | 1.5 km || 
|-id=599 bgcolor=#fefefe
| 479599 ||  || — || October 29, 2005 || Mount Lemmon || Mount Lemmon Survey || MAS || align=right data-sort-value="0.65" | 650 m || 
|-id=600 bgcolor=#E9E9E9
| 479600 ||  || — || September 3, 2007 || Catalina || CSS || — || align=right | 2.0 km || 
|}

479601–479700 

|-bgcolor=#E9E9E9
| 479601 ||  || — || February 14, 2010 || Kitt Peak || Spacewatch || EUN || align=right | 1.1 km || 
|-id=602 bgcolor=#d6d6d6
| 479602 ||  || — || February 12, 2004 || Kitt Peak || Spacewatch || — || align=right | 3.0 km || 
|-id=603 bgcolor=#fefefe
| 479603 ||  || — || February 16, 2010 || WISE || WISE || — || align=right data-sort-value="0.80" | 800 m || 
|-id=604 bgcolor=#d6d6d6
| 479604 ||  || — || September 29, 2005 || Kitt Peak || Spacewatch || TIR || align=right | 3.2 km || 
|-id=605 bgcolor=#E9E9E9
| 479605 ||  || — || April 9, 2010 || Catalina || CSS || — || align=right | 2.0 km || 
|-id=606 bgcolor=#E9E9E9
| 479606 ||  || — || January 2, 2009 || Mount Lemmon || Mount Lemmon Survey || — || align=right | 2.1 km || 
|-id=607 bgcolor=#fefefe
| 479607 ||  || — || December 31, 2002 || Kitt Peak || Spacewatch || — || align=right data-sort-value="0.83" | 830 m || 
|-id=608 bgcolor=#fefefe
| 479608 ||  || — || January 10, 2010 || Kitt Peak || Spacewatch || — || align=right data-sort-value="0.78" | 780 m || 
|-id=609 bgcolor=#E9E9E9
| 479609 ||  || — || January 28, 2014 || Mount Lemmon || Mount Lemmon Survey || — || align=right | 1.6 km || 
|-id=610 bgcolor=#fefefe
| 479610 ||  || — || October 23, 2005 || Catalina || CSS || — || align=right data-sort-value="0.80" | 800 m || 
|-id=611 bgcolor=#fefefe
| 479611 ||  || — || November 21, 2009 || Kitt Peak || Spacewatch || NYS || align=right data-sort-value="0.66" | 660 m || 
|-id=612 bgcolor=#E9E9E9
| 479612 ||  || — || March 25, 2006 || Kitt Peak || Spacewatch || — || align=right data-sort-value="0.98" | 980 m || 
|-id=613 bgcolor=#E9E9E9
| 479613 ||  || — || September 20, 2003 || Kitt Peak || Spacewatch || — || align=right | 2.2 km || 
|-id=614 bgcolor=#E9E9E9
| 479614 ||  || — || March 12, 2010 || Kitt Peak || Spacewatch || — || align=right | 1.4 km || 
|-id=615 bgcolor=#d6d6d6
| 479615 ||  || — || January 18, 2008 || Mount Lemmon || Mount Lemmon Survey || — || align=right | 3.1 km || 
|-id=616 bgcolor=#E9E9E9
| 479616 ||  || — || February 10, 2010 || Kitt Peak || Spacewatch || — || align=right | 1.0 km || 
|-id=617 bgcolor=#fefefe
| 479617 ||  || — || October 21, 2009 || Mount Lemmon || Mount Lemmon Survey || — || align=right | 1.6 km || 
|-id=618 bgcolor=#fefefe
| 479618 ||  || — || November 23, 2009 || Kitt Peak || Spacewatch || NYS || align=right data-sort-value="0.52" | 520 m || 
|-id=619 bgcolor=#d6d6d6
| 479619 ||  || — || December 16, 2007 || Mount Lemmon || Mount Lemmon Survey || — || align=right | 2.7 km || 
|-id=620 bgcolor=#fefefe
| 479620 ||  || — || December 10, 2005 || Kitt Peak || Spacewatch || — || align=right data-sort-value="0.86" | 860 m || 
|-id=621 bgcolor=#E9E9E9
| 479621 ||  || — || May 5, 1997 || Kitt Peak || Spacewatch || — || align=right | 2.0 km || 
|-id=622 bgcolor=#E9E9E9
| 479622 ||  || — || October 9, 2012 || Mount Lemmon || Mount Lemmon Survey || — || align=right | 1.5 km || 
|-id=623 bgcolor=#fefefe
| 479623 ||  || — || December 19, 2009 || Kitt Peak || Spacewatch || — || align=right data-sort-value="0.82" | 820 m || 
|-id=624 bgcolor=#E9E9E9
| 479624 ||  || — || December 22, 2008 || Mount Lemmon || Mount Lemmon Survey ||  || align=right | 2.6 km || 
|-id=625 bgcolor=#E9E9E9
| 479625 ||  || — || February 17, 2010 || Kitt Peak || Spacewatch || — || align=right data-sort-value="0.90" | 900 m || 
|-id=626 bgcolor=#E9E9E9
| 479626 ||  || — || February 27, 2006 || Kitt Peak || Spacewatch || — || align=right data-sort-value="0.94" | 940 m || 
|-id=627 bgcolor=#fefefe
| 479627 ||  || — || December 5, 2005 || Kitt Peak || Spacewatch || — || align=right data-sort-value="0.70" | 700 m || 
|-id=628 bgcolor=#E9E9E9
| 479628 ||  || — || March 13, 2005 || Catalina || CSS || — || align=right | 1.9 km || 
|-id=629 bgcolor=#E9E9E9
| 479629 ||  || — || May 24, 2011 || Mount Lemmon || Mount Lemmon Survey || MAR || align=right | 1.0 km || 
|-id=630 bgcolor=#E9E9E9
| 479630 ||  || — || September 10, 2007 || Mount Lemmon || Mount Lemmon Survey || — || align=right | 2.3 km || 
|-id=631 bgcolor=#E9E9E9
| 479631 ||  || — || December 6, 2008 || Kitt Peak || Spacewatch || — || align=right | 1.4 km || 
|-id=632 bgcolor=#fefefe
| 479632 ||  || — || November 24, 2009 || Mount Lemmon || Mount Lemmon Survey || — || align=right data-sort-value="0.63" | 630 m || 
|-id=633 bgcolor=#E9E9E9
| 479633 ||  || — || May 1, 2006 || Kitt Peak || Spacewatch || — || align=right | 1.5 km || 
|-id=634 bgcolor=#d6d6d6
| 479634 ||  || — || January 19, 2004 || Kitt Peak || Spacewatch || 615 || align=right | 1.2 km || 
|-id=635 bgcolor=#E9E9E9
| 479635 ||  || — || April 2, 2006 || Kitt Peak || Spacewatch || — || align=right | 1.1 km || 
|-id=636 bgcolor=#fefefe
| 479636 ||  || — || October 27, 2009 || Mount Lemmon || Mount Lemmon Survey || V || align=right data-sort-value="0.71" | 710 m || 
|-id=637 bgcolor=#d6d6d6
| 479637 ||  || — || February 24, 2009 || Mount Lemmon || Mount Lemmon Survey || — || align=right | 3.0 km || 
|-id=638 bgcolor=#E9E9E9
| 479638 ||  || — || November 8, 2008 || Kitt Peak || Spacewatch || — || align=right | 1.3 km || 
|-id=639 bgcolor=#fefefe
| 479639 ||  || — || November 18, 2001 || Kitt Peak || Spacewatch || NYS || align=right data-sort-value="0.63" | 630 m || 
|-id=640 bgcolor=#E9E9E9
| 479640 ||  || — || March 10, 2005 || Mount Lemmon || Mount Lemmon Survey || — || align=right | 1.6 km || 
|-id=641 bgcolor=#E9E9E9
| 479641 ||  || — || October 15, 2007 || Mount Lemmon || Mount Lemmon Survey || — || align=right | 2.3 km || 
|-id=642 bgcolor=#d6d6d6
| 479642 ||  || — || May 15, 2010 || WISE || WISE || — || align=right | 2.7 km || 
|-id=643 bgcolor=#fefefe
| 479643 ||  || — || March 10, 2007 || Mount Lemmon || Mount Lemmon Survey || — || align=right data-sort-value="0.75" | 750 m || 
|-id=644 bgcolor=#E9E9E9
| 479644 ||  || — || September 17, 1995 || Kitt Peak || Spacewatch || ADE || align=right | 1.4 km || 
|-id=645 bgcolor=#E9E9E9
| 479645 ||  || — || April 19, 2006 || Mount Lemmon || Mount Lemmon Survey || — || align=right data-sort-value="0.86" | 860 m || 
|-id=646 bgcolor=#d6d6d6
| 479646 ||  || — || September 30, 2011 || Kitt Peak || Spacewatch || — || align=right | 2.4 km || 
|-id=647 bgcolor=#d6d6d6
| 479647 ||  || — || March 31, 2009 || Mount Lemmon || Mount Lemmon Survey || EOS || align=right | 1.7 km || 
|-id=648 bgcolor=#E9E9E9
| 479648 ||  || — || November 13, 2012 || Mount Lemmon || Mount Lemmon Survey || HOF || align=right | 2.3 km || 
|-id=649 bgcolor=#E9E9E9
| 479649 ||  || — || November 11, 2012 || Catalina || CSS || — || align=right | 1.2 km || 
|-id=650 bgcolor=#E9E9E9
| 479650 ||  || — || October 22, 2003 || Kitt Peak || Spacewatch || — || align=right | 1.6 km || 
|-id=651 bgcolor=#E9E9E9
| 479651 ||  || — || November 10, 2004 || Kitt Peak || Spacewatch || — || align=right | 1.1 km || 
|-id=652 bgcolor=#E9E9E9
| 479652 ||  || — || February 1, 2005 || Kitt Peak || Spacewatch || — || align=right | 1.5 km || 
|-id=653 bgcolor=#d6d6d6
| 479653 ||  || — || April 8, 2003 || Kitt Peak || Spacewatch || — || align=right | 2.7 km || 
|-id=654 bgcolor=#E9E9E9
| 479654 ||  || — || March 3, 2005 || Catalina || CSS || — || align=right | 2.9 km || 
|-id=655 bgcolor=#E9E9E9
| 479655 ||  || — || August 9, 2007 || Kitt Peak || Spacewatch || — || align=right | 1.5 km || 
|-id=656 bgcolor=#d6d6d6
| 479656 ||  || — || November 14, 2006 || Kitt Peak || Spacewatch || — || align=right | 2.9 km || 
|-id=657 bgcolor=#E9E9E9
| 479657 ||  || — || March 18, 2010 || Kitt Peak || Spacewatch || — || align=right data-sort-value="0.98" | 980 m || 
|-id=658 bgcolor=#E9E9E9
| 479658 ||  || — || April 1, 2005 || Kitt Peak || Spacewatch || — || align=right | 1.9 km || 
|-id=659 bgcolor=#E9E9E9
| 479659 ||  || — || November 19, 2003 || Kitt Peak || Spacewatch || WIT || align=right | 1.1 km || 
|-id=660 bgcolor=#E9E9E9
| 479660 ||  || — || November 3, 2007 || Mount Lemmon || Mount Lemmon Survey || — || align=right | 2.0 km || 
|-id=661 bgcolor=#E9E9E9
| 479661 ||  || — || September 26, 2012 || Mount Lemmon || Mount Lemmon Survey || (5) || align=right data-sort-value="0.79" | 790 m || 
|-id=662 bgcolor=#d6d6d6
| 479662 ||  || — || January 10, 2008 || Mount Lemmon || Mount Lemmon Survey || HYG || align=right | 2.7 km || 
|-id=663 bgcolor=#E9E9E9
| 479663 ||  || — || October 15, 2007 || Mount Lemmon || Mount Lemmon Survey || — || align=right | 1.9 km || 
|-id=664 bgcolor=#d6d6d6
| 479664 ||  || — || December 6, 2012 || Mount Lemmon || Mount Lemmon Survey || — || align=right | 2.2 km || 
|-id=665 bgcolor=#fefefe
| 479665 ||  || — || March 13, 2007 || Mount Lemmon || Mount Lemmon Survey || — || align=right data-sort-value="0.69" | 690 m || 
|-id=666 bgcolor=#d6d6d6
| 479666 ||  || — || March 18, 2004 || Kitt Peak || Spacewatch || — || align=right | 2.8 km || 
|-id=667 bgcolor=#fefefe
| 479667 ||  || — || January 8, 2010 || Mount Lemmon || Mount Lemmon Survey || — || align=right data-sort-value="0.91" | 910 m || 
|-id=668 bgcolor=#d6d6d6
| 479668 ||  || — || December 4, 2007 || Mount Lemmon || Mount Lemmon Survey || — || align=right | 3.2 km || 
|-id=669 bgcolor=#E9E9E9
| 479669 ||  || — || September 19, 2007 || Kitt Peak || Spacewatch || — || align=right | 1.8 km || 
|-id=670 bgcolor=#E9E9E9
| 479670 ||  || — || November 11, 2004 || Anderson Mesa || LONEOS || — || align=right | 1.0 km || 
|-id=671 bgcolor=#d6d6d6
| 479671 ||  || — || October 1, 2011 || Kitt Peak || Spacewatch || — || align=right | 3.3 km || 
|-id=672 bgcolor=#d6d6d6
| 479672 ||  || — || April 20, 2009 || Mount Lemmon || Mount Lemmon Survey || — || align=right | 2.2 km || 
|-id=673 bgcolor=#fefefe
| 479673 ||  || — || October 1, 2005 || Kitt Peak || Spacewatch || — || align=right data-sort-value="0.69" | 690 m || 
|-id=674 bgcolor=#E9E9E9
| 479674 ||  || — || September 10, 2007 || Mount Lemmon || Mount Lemmon Survey || AGN || align=right | 1.1 km || 
|-id=675 bgcolor=#d6d6d6
| 479675 ||  || — || November 8, 2007 || Kitt Peak || Spacewatch || EOS || align=right | 1.8 km || 
|-id=676 bgcolor=#E9E9E9
| 479676 ||  || — || September 10, 2007 || Mount Lemmon || Mount Lemmon Survey || — || align=right | 1.8 km || 
|-id=677 bgcolor=#E9E9E9
| 479677 ||  || — || January 19, 2005 || Kitt Peak || Spacewatch || — || align=right | 2.2 km || 
|-id=678 bgcolor=#fefefe
| 479678 ||  || — || October 27, 2005 || Kitt Peak || Spacewatch || — || align=right data-sort-value="0.76" | 760 m || 
|-id=679 bgcolor=#E9E9E9
| 479679 ||  || — || March 18, 2010 || Mount Lemmon || Mount Lemmon Survey || — || align=right | 1.0 km || 
|-id=680 bgcolor=#d6d6d6
| 479680 ||  || — || November 19, 2007 || Mount Lemmon || Mount Lemmon Survey || EOS || align=right | 1.9 km || 
|-id=681 bgcolor=#E9E9E9
| 479681 ||  || — || October 25, 2008 || Kitt Peak || Spacewatch || — || align=right | 1.5 km || 
|-id=682 bgcolor=#E9E9E9
| 479682 ||  || — || September 11, 2004 || Kitt Peak || Spacewatch || — || align=right data-sort-value="0.73" | 730 m || 
|-id=683 bgcolor=#E9E9E9
| 479683 ||  || — || March 14, 2010 || Kitt Peak || Spacewatch || — || align=right | 1.3 km || 
|-id=684 bgcolor=#E9E9E9
| 479684 ||  || — || November 17, 2007 || Kitt Peak || Spacewatch || — || align=right | 2.6 km || 
|-id=685 bgcolor=#E9E9E9
| 479685 ||  || — || September 26, 1995 || Kitt Peak || Spacewatch || — || align=right | 1.3 km || 
|-id=686 bgcolor=#E9E9E9
| 479686 ||  || — || September 13, 2007 || Mount Lemmon || Mount Lemmon Survey || — || align=right | 2.2 km || 
|-id=687 bgcolor=#E9E9E9
| 479687 ||  || — || September 13, 2007 || Mount Lemmon || Mount Lemmon Survey || — || align=right | 1.9 km || 
|-id=688 bgcolor=#E9E9E9
| 479688 ||  || — || June 19, 2006 || Mount Lemmon || Mount Lemmon Survey || AGN || align=right | 1.4 km || 
|-id=689 bgcolor=#E9E9E9
| 479689 ||  || — || February 1, 2005 || Kitt Peak || Spacewatch || — || align=right | 1.6 km || 
|-id=690 bgcolor=#E9E9E9
| 479690 ||  || — || February 24, 2006 || Kitt Peak || Spacewatch || — || align=right data-sort-value="0.94" | 940 m || 
|-id=691 bgcolor=#E9E9E9
| 479691 ||  || — || September 12, 2007 || Mount Lemmon || Mount Lemmon Survey || — || align=right | 1.8 km || 
|-id=692 bgcolor=#fefefe
| 479692 ||  || — || January 11, 2010 || Kitt Peak || Spacewatch || NYS || align=right data-sort-value="0.61" | 610 m || 
|-id=693 bgcolor=#d6d6d6
| 479693 ||  || — || November 16, 2006 || Kitt Peak || Spacewatch || — || align=right | 2.6 km || 
|-id=694 bgcolor=#d6d6d6
| 479694 ||  || — || March 3, 2009 || Mount Lemmon || Mount Lemmon Survey || EOS || align=right | 1.3 km || 
|-id=695 bgcolor=#E9E9E9
| 479695 ||  || — || March 9, 2005 || Catalina || CSS || — || align=right | 1.6 km || 
|-id=696 bgcolor=#E9E9E9
| 479696 ||  || — || September 10, 2007 || Kitt Peak || Spacewatch || — || align=right | 1.9 km || 
|-id=697 bgcolor=#E9E9E9
| 479697 ||  || — || October 21, 2008 || Kitt Peak || Spacewatch ||  || align=right | 1.2 km || 
|-id=698 bgcolor=#E9E9E9
| 479698 ||  || — || September 13, 2007 || Mount Lemmon || Mount Lemmon Survey || — || align=right | 1.2 km || 
|-id=699 bgcolor=#E9E9E9
| 479699 ||  || — || October 10, 2007 || Mount Lemmon || Mount Lemmon Survey || — || align=right | 2.3 km || 
|-id=700 bgcolor=#fefefe
| 479700 ||  || — || January 4, 2010 || Kitt Peak || Spacewatch || NYS || align=right data-sort-value="0.67" | 670 m || 
|}

479701–479800 

|-bgcolor=#d6d6d6
| 479701 ||  || — || February 2, 2008 || Kitt Peak || Spacewatch || — || align=right | 3.1 km || 
|-id=702 bgcolor=#E9E9E9
| 479702 ||  || — || September 5, 1999 || Kitt Peak || Spacewatch || MAR || align=right data-sort-value="0.95" | 950 m || 
|-id=703 bgcolor=#E9E9E9
| 479703 ||  || — || September 11, 2007 || Kitt Peak || Spacewatch || — || align=right | 1.3 km || 
|-id=704 bgcolor=#d6d6d6
| 479704 ||  || — || March 31, 2009 || Kitt Peak || Spacewatch || — || align=right | 2.5 km || 
|-id=705 bgcolor=#E9E9E9
| 479705 ||  || — || March 3, 2005 || Catalina || CSS || — || align=right | 2.5 km || 
|-id=706 bgcolor=#d6d6d6
| 479706 ||  || — || March 15, 2004 || Kitt Peak || Spacewatch || — || align=right | 2.6 km || 
|-id=707 bgcolor=#E9E9E9
| 479707 ||  || — || April 2, 2005 || Kitt Peak || Spacewatch || AGN || align=right | 1.1 km || 
|-id=708 bgcolor=#E9E9E9
| 479708 ||  || — || May 9, 2006 || Mount Lemmon || Mount Lemmon Survey || — || align=right | 1.5 km || 
|-id=709 bgcolor=#fefefe
| 479709 ||  || — || July 29, 2008 || Mount Lemmon || Mount Lemmon Survey || V || align=right data-sort-value="0.76" | 760 m || 
|-id=710 bgcolor=#E9E9E9
| 479710 ||  || — || February 17, 2010 || WISE || WISE || — || align=right | 2.5 km || 
|-id=711 bgcolor=#d6d6d6
| 479711 ||  || — || August 28, 2005 || Kitt Peak || Spacewatch || — || align=right | 4.8 km || 
|-id=712 bgcolor=#E9E9E9
| 479712 ||  || — || September 10, 2007 || Mount Lemmon || Mount Lemmon Survey || MAR || align=right | 1.2 km || 
|-id=713 bgcolor=#E9E9E9
| 479713 ||  || — || October 26, 2012 || Mount Lemmon || Mount Lemmon Survey || — || align=right | 1.1 km || 
|-id=714 bgcolor=#E9E9E9
| 479714 ||  || — || November 1, 2007 || Mount Lemmon || Mount Lemmon Survey || AGN || align=right | 1.1 km || 
|-id=715 bgcolor=#E9E9E9
| 479715 ||  || — || December 29, 2008 || Kitt Peak || Spacewatch || — || align=right | 1.3 km || 
|-id=716 bgcolor=#E9E9E9
| 479716 ||  || — || October 21, 2007 || Kitt Peak || Spacewatch || — || align=right | 2.4 km || 
|-id=717 bgcolor=#d6d6d6
| 479717 ||  || — || February 19, 2009 || Kitt Peak || Spacewatch || — || align=right | 2.4 km || 
|-id=718 bgcolor=#d6d6d6
| 479718 ||  || — || January 3, 2014 || Mount Lemmon || Mount Lemmon Survey || — || align=right | 2.9 km || 
|-id=719 bgcolor=#E9E9E9
| 479719 ||  || — || October 12, 2007 || Kitt Peak || Spacewatch || — || align=right | 1.8 km || 
|-id=720 bgcolor=#fefefe
| 479720 ||  || — || November 1, 2005 || Mount Lemmon || Mount Lemmon Survey || MAS || align=right data-sort-value="0.68" | 680 m || 
|-id=721 bgcolor=#d6d6d6
| 479721 ||  || — || October 2, 2006 || Mount Lemmon || Mount Lemmon Survey || — || align=right | 2.4 km || 
|-id=722 bgcolor=#E9E9E9
| 479722 ||  || — || September 12, 2007 || Mount Lemmon || Mount Lemmon Survey || — || align=right | 1.6 km || 
|-id=723 bgcolor=#E9E9E9
| 479723 ||  || — || October 21, 2007 || Kitt Peak || Spacewatch || — || align=right | 2.1 km || 
|-id=724 bgcolor=#fefefe
| 479724 ||  || — || October 1, 2005 || Mount Lemmon || Mount Lemmon Survey || — || align=right data-sort-value="0.57" | 570 m || 
|-id=725 bgcolor=#E9E9E9
| 479725 ||  || — || October 14, 2007 || Mount Lemmon || Mount Lemmon Survey || — || align=right | 1.9 km || 
|-id=726 bgcolor=#d6d6d6
| 479726 ||  || — || October 16, 2007 || Mount Lemmon || Mount Lemmon Survey || KOR || align=right | 1.3 km || 
|-id=727 bgcolor=#fefefe
| 479727 ||  || — || January 6, 2010 || Kitt Peak || Spacewatch || — || align=right data-sort-value="0.69" | 690 m || 
|-id=728 bgcolor=#E9E9E9
| 479728 ||  || — || March 19, 2010 || Mount Lemmon || Mount Lemmon Survey || — || align=right | 2.2 km || 
|-id=729 bgcolor=#d6d6d6
| 479729 ||  || — || February 1, 2009 || Kitt Peak || Spacewatch || — || align=right | 2.1 km || 
|-id=730 bgcolor=#E9E9E9
| 479730 ||  || — || February 2, 2009 || Mount Lemmon || Mount Lemmon Survey || — || align=right | 1.6 km || 
|-id=731 bgcolor=#E9E9E9
| 479731 ||  || — || October 8, 2007 || Mount Lemmon || Mount Lemmon Survey || — || align=right | 2.0 km || 
|-id=732 bgcolor=#d6d6d6
| 479732 ||  || — || September 23, 2011 || Kitt Peak || Spacewatch || — || align=right | 3.2 km || 
|-id=733 bgcolor=#E9E9E9
| 479733 ||  || — || March 8, 2005 || Mount Lemmon || Mount Lemmon Survey || — || align=right | 1.6 km || 
|-id=734 bgcolor=#E9E9E9
| 479734 ||  || — || March 16, 2005 || Kitt Peak || Spacewatch || — || align=right | 2.3 km || 
|-id=735 bgcolor=#E9E9E9
| 479735 ||  || — || March 25, 2010 || Mount Lemmon || Mount Lemmon Survey || — || align=right data-sort-value="0.96" | 960 m || 
|-id=736 bgcolor=#E9E9E9
| 479736 ||  || — || October 9, 2004 || Kitt Peak || Spacewatch || — || align=right data-sort-value="0.86" | 860 m || 
|-id=737 bgcolor=#fefefe
| 479737 ||  || — || December 16, 1995 || Kitt Peak || Spacewatch || — || align=right data-sort-value="0.74" | 740 m || 
|-id=738 bgcolor=#E9E9E9
| 479738 ||  || — || September 11, 2007 || Kitt Peak || Spacewatch || — || align=right | 2.1 km || 
|-id=739 bgcolor=#E9E9E9
| 479739 ||  || — || October 25, 2008 || Mount Lemmon || Mount Lemmon Survey || — || align=right | 1.2 km || 
|-id=740 bgcolor=#d6d6d6
| 479740 ||  || — || September 14, 2006 || Kitt Peak || Spacewatch || — || align=right | 3.2 km || 
|-id=741 bgcolor=#E9E9E9
| 479741 ||  || — || September 5, 2008 || Kitt Peak || Spacewatch || — || align=right data-sort-value="0.85" | 850 m || 
|-id=742 bgcolor=#d6d6d6
| 479742 ||  || — || April 19, 2009 || Kitt Peak || Spacewatch || — || align=right | 2.7 km || 
|-id=743 bgcolor=#E9E9E9
| 479743 ||  || — || March 12, 2010 || WISE || WISE || — || align=right | 2.0 km || 
|-id=744 bgcolor=#E9E9E9
| 479744 ||  || — || December 18, 2004 || Mount Lemmon || Mount Lemmon Survey || — || align=right | 1.5 km || 
|-id=745 bgcolor=#E9E9E9
| 479745 ||  || — || December 22, 2008 || Mount Lemmon || Mount Lemmon Survey || — || align=right | 2.2 km || 
|-id=746 bgcolor=#E9E9E9
| 479746 ||  || — || January 13, 2005 || Kitt Peak || Spacewatch || — || align=right | 1.7 km || 
|-id=747 bgcolor=#fefefe
| 479747 ||  || — || March 31, 2003 || Kitt Peak || Spacewatch || — || align=right data-sort-value="0.86" | 860 m || 
|-id=748 bgcolor=#fefefe
| 479748 ||  || — || November 28, 2005 || Kitt Peak || Spacewatch || — || align=right data-sort-value="0.77" | 770 m || 
|-id=749 bgcolor=#E9E9E9
| 479749 ||  || — || February 20, 2009 || Mount Lemmon || Mount Lemmon Survey || — || align=right | 2.0 km || 
|-id=750 bgcolor=#E9E9E9
| 479750 ||  || — || October 23, 2003 || Kitt Peak || Spacewatch || — || align=right | 2.0 km || 
|-id=751 bgcolor=#fefefe
| 479751 ||  || — || January 7, 2006 || Mount Lemmon || Mount Lemmon Survey || MAS || align=right data-sort-value="0.63" | 630 m || 
|-id=752 bgcolor=#fefefe
| 479752 ||  || — || November 10, 2009 || Kitt Peak || Spacewatch || ERI || align=right | 1.4 km || 
|-id=753 bgcolor=#E9E9E9
| 479753 ||  || — || September 3, 2008 || Kitt Peak || Spacewatch || — || align=right data-sort-value="0.89" | 890 m || 
|-id=754 bgcolor=#E9E9E9
| 479754 ||  || — || October 11, 2007 || Kitt Peak || Spacewatch || — || align=right | 2.3 km || 
|-id=755 bgcolor=#E9E9E9
| 479755 ||  || — || January 28, 2006 || Kitt Peak || Spacewatch || — || align=right | 1.4 km || 
|-id=756 bgcolor=#fefefe
| 479756 ||  || — || January 10, 2014 || Mount Lemmon || Mount Lemmon Survey || — || align=right data-sort-value="0.69" | 690 m || 
|-id=757 bgcolor=#E9E9E9
| 479757 ||  || — || September 7, 2004 || Kitt Peak || Spacewatch || — || align=right data-sort-value="0.82" | 820 m || 
|-id=758 bgcolor=#d6d6d6
| 479758 ||  || — || August 28, 2006 || Kitt Peak || Spacewatch || KOR || align=right | 1.3 km || 
|-id=759 bgcolor=#E9E9E9
| 479759 ||  || — || November 6, 2012 || Kitt Peak || Spacewatch || — || align=right | 1.7 km || 
|-id=760 bgcolor=#E9E9E9
| 479760 ||  || — || November 23, 2012 || Kitt Peak || Spacewatch || — || align=right | 1.8 km || 
|-id=761 bgcolor=#E9E9E9
| 479761 ||  || — || October 6, 2008 || Mount Lemmon || Mount Lemmon Survey || — || align=right | 1.3 km || 
|-id=762 bgcolor=#E9E9E9
| 479762 ||  || — || February 23, 2006 || Anderson Mesa || LONEOS || — || align=right | 1.3 km || 
|-id=763 bgcolor=#E9E9E9
| 479763 ||  || — || January 7, 2009 || Kitt Peak || Spacewatch || — || align=right | 1.3 km || 
|-id=764 bgcolor=#E9E9E9
| 479764 ||  || — || November 15, 1995 || Kitt Peak || Spacewatch || — || align=right | 1.4 km || 
|-id=765 bgcolor=#d6d6d6
| 479765 ||  || — || February 27, 2009 || Kitt Peak || Spacewatch || KOR || align=right | 1.5 km || 
|-id=766 bgcolor=#E9E9E9
| 479766 ||  || — || April 11, 2005 || Kitt Peak || Spacewatch || — || align=right | 1.9 km || 
|-id=767 bgcolor=#E9E9E9
| 479767 ||  || — || October 5, 2004 || Kitt Peak || Spacewatch || (5) || align=right data-sort-value="0.67" | 670 m || 
|-id=768 bgcolor=#E9E9E9
| 479768 ||  || — || December 3, 2012 || Mount Lemmon || Mount Lemmon Survey || — || align=right | 2.1 km || 
|-id=769 bgcolor=#E9E9E9
| 479769 ||  || — || September 19, 2003 || Kitt Peak || Spacewatch || — || align=right | 1.6 km || 
|-id=770 bgcolor=#E9E9E9
| 479770 ||  || — || March 14, 2010 || Kitt Peak || Spacewatch || — || align=right | 1.7 km || 
|-id=771 bgcolor=#E9E9E9
| 479771 ||  || — || October 2, 2008 || Mount Lemmon || Mount Lemmon Survey || — || align=right data-sort-value="0.90" | 900 m || 
|-id=772 bgcolor=#E9E9E9
| 479772 ||  || — || September 30, 2003 || Kitt Peak || Spacewatch || — || align=right | 1.8 km || 
|-id=773 bgcolor=#E9E9E9
| 479773 ||  || — || February 2, 2009 || Kitt Peak || Spacewatch || — || align=right | 2.5 km || 
|-id=774 bgcolor=#d6d6d6
| 479774 ||  || — || April 18, 2009 || Kitt Peak || Spacewatch || — || align=right | 3.0 km || 
|-id=775 bgcolor=#E9E9E9
| 479775 ||  || — || January 1, 2009 || Kitt Peak || Spacewatch || — || align=right | 2.1 km || 
|-id=776 bgcolor=#E9E9E9
| 479776 ||  || — || January 17, 2009 || Kitt Peak || Spacewatch || — || align=right | 2.3 km || 
|-id=777 bgcolor=#E9E9E9
| 479777 ||  || — || April 9, 2010 || Mount Lemmon || Mount Lemmon Survey || — || align=right | 1.4 km || 
|-id=778 bgcolor=#d6d6d6
| 479778 ||  || — || May 26, 2010 || WISE || WISE || — || align=right | 5.0 km || 
|-id=779 bgcolor=#d6d6d6
| 479779 ||  || — || May 4, 2009 || Mount Lemmon || Mount Lemmon Survey || — || align=right | 3.7 km || 
|-id=780 bgcolor=#E9E9E9
| 479780 ||  || — || January 16, 2005 || Kitt Peak || Spacewatch || — || align=right | 1.2 km || 
|-id=781 bgcolor=#d6d6d6
| 479781 ||  || — || March 2, 2009 || Mount Lemmon || Mount Lemmon Survey || EOS || align=right | 1.9 km || 
|-id=782 bgcolor=#d6d6d6
| 479782 ||  || — || December 30, 2007 || Kitt Peak || Spacewatch || EOS || align=right | 1.9 km || 
|-id=783 bgcolor=#d6d6d6
| 479783 ||  || — || February 20, 2009 || Mount Lemmon || Mount Lemmon Survey || — || align=right | 3.1 km || 
|-id=784 bgcolor=#d6d6d6
| 479784 ||  || — || February 23, 2010 || WISE || WISE || — || align=right | 3.6 km || 
|-id=785 bgcolor=#d6d6d6
| 479785 ||  || — || December 7, 2012 || Mount Lemmon || Mount Lemmon Survey || — || align=right | 3.0 km || 
|-id=786 bgcolor=#E9E9E9
| 479786 ||  || — || April 2, 2006 || Kitt Peak || Spacewatch || — || align=right | 1.6 km || 
|-id=787 bgcolor=#d6d6d6
| 479787 ||  || — || November 18, 2001 || Kitt Peak || Spacewatch || — || align=right | 2.5 km || 
|-id=788 bgcolor=#E9E9E9
| 479788 ||  || — || October 15, 2012 || Catalina || CSS || MAR || align=right | 1.2 km || 
|-id=789 bgcolor=#E9E9E9
| 479789 ||  || — || September 20, 2003 || Campo Imperatore || CINEOS || — || align=right | 2.3 km || 
|-id=790 bgcolor=#d6d6d6
| 479790 ||  || — || December 3, 2007 || Kitt Peak || Spacewatch || — || align=right | 3.4 km || 
|-id=791 bgcolor=#E9E9E9
| 479791 ||  || — || February 7, 2010 || WISE || WISE || — || align=right | 2.2 km || 
|-id=792 bgcolor=#fefefe
| 479792 ||  || — || October 30, 2005 || Mount Lemmon || Mount Lemmon Survey || NYS || align=right data-sort-value="0.66" | 660 m || 
|-id=793 bgcolor=#d6d6d6
| 479793 ||  || — || September 30, 2006 || Mount Lemmon || Mount Lemmon Survey || — || align=right | 2.2 km || 
|-id=794 bgcolor=#E9E9E9
| 479794 ||  || — || January 31, 2009 || Kitt Peak || Spacewatch || AGN || align=right | 1.1 km || 
|-id=795 bgcolor=#d6d6d6
| 479795 ||  || — || March 2, 2009 || Mount Lemmon || Mount Lemmon Survey || — || align=right | 3.5 km || 
|-id=796 bgcolor=#d6d6d6
| 479796 ||  || — || March 18, 2009 || Kitt Peak || Spacewatch || — || align=right | 2.7 km || 
|-id=797 bgcolor=#d6d6d6
| 479797 ||  || — || March 31, 2009 || Mount Lemmon || Mount Lemmon Survey || — || align=right | 2.6 km || 
|-id=798 bgcolor=#E9E9E9
| 479798 ||  || — || November 18, 2003 || Kitt Peak || Spacewatch || WIT || align=right | 1.2 km || 
|-id=799 bgcolor=#E9E9E9
| 479799 ||  || — || March 16, 2005 || Mount Lemmon || Mount Lemmon Survey || — || align=right | 2.0 km || 
|-id=800 bgcolor=#E9E9E9
| 479800 ||  || — || April 9, 2005 || Mount Lemmon || Mount Lemmon Survey || — || align=right | 1.9 km || 
|}

479801–479900 

|-bgcolor=#d6d6d6
| 479801 ||  || — || February 22, 2003 || Anderson Mesa || LONEOS || — || align=right | 4.4 km || 
|-id=802 bgcolor=#d6d6d6
| 479802 ||  || — || March 19, 2009 || Mount Lemmon || Mount Lemmon Survey || — || align=right | 2.8 km || 
|-id=803 bgcolor=#E9E9E9
| 479803 ||  || — || October 28, 1994 || Kitt Peak || Spacewatch || — || align=right | 1.9 km || 
|-id=804 bgcolor=#d6d6d6
| 479804 ||  || — || October 12, 2006 || Kitt Peak || Spacewatch || — || align=right | 2.4 km || 
|-id=805 bgcolor=#E9E9E9
| 479805 ||  || — || October 26, 2012 || Mount Lemmon || Mount Lemmon Survey || — || align=right | 2.2 km || 
|-id=806 bgcolor=#d6d6d6
| 479806 ||  || — || September 17, 2006 || Kitt Peak || Spacewatch || — || align=right | 2.6 km || 
|-id=807 bgcolor=#fefefe
| 479807 ||  || — || March 19, 2007 || Mount Lemmon || Mount Lemmon Survey || — || align=right data-sort-value="0.79" | 790 m || 
|-id=808 bgcolor=#E9E9E9
| 479808 ||  || — || January 24, 2010 || WISE || WISE || ADE || align=right | 3.3 km || 
|-id=809 bgcolor=#d6d6d6
| 479809 ||  || — || August 30, 2005 || Kitt Peak || Spacewatch || — || align=right | 2.4 km || 
|-id=810 bgcolor=#d6d6d6
| 479810 ||  || — || May 4, 2010 || WISE || WISE || — || align=right | 5.4 km || 
|-id=811 bgcolor=#d6d6d6
| 479811 ||  || — || October 22, 2006 || Mount Lemmon || Mount Lemmon Survey || — || align=right | 3.4 km || 
|-id=812 bgcolor=#d6d6d6
| 479812 ||  || — || March 29, 2009 || Catalina || CSS || — || align=right | 2.8 km || 
|-id=813 bgcolor=#E9E9E9
| 479813 ||  || — || March 16, 2010 || Mount Lemmon || Mount Lemmon Survey || (5) || align=right data-sort-value="0.74" | 740 m || 
|-id=814 bgcolor=#d6d6d6
| 479814 ||  || — || February 20, 2009 || Kitt Peak || Spacewatch || — || align=right | 2.7 km || 
|-id=815 bgcolor=#E9E9E9
| 479815 ||  || — || October 19, 2012 || Mount Lemmon || Mount Lemmon Survey || JUN || align=right data-sort-value="0.95" | 950 m || 
|-id=816 bgcolor=#E9E9E9
| 479816 ||  || — || April 11, 2005 || Kitt Peak || Spacewatch || — || align=right | 2.0 km || 
|-id=817 bgcolor=#d6d6d6
| 479817 ||  || — || October 22, 2006 || Kitt Peak || Spacewatch || — || align=right | 2.9 km || 
|-id=818 bgcolor=#E9E9E9
| 479818 ||  || — || January 1, 2009 || Mount Lemmon || Mount Lemmon Survey || EUN || align=right | 1.3 km || 
|-id=819 bgcolor=#E9E9E9
| 479819 ||  || — || November 13, 2012 || Kitt Peak || Spacewatch || — || align=right | 1.6 km || 
|-id=820 bgcolor=#d6d6d6
| 479820 ||  || — || October 2, 2006 || Mount Lemmon || Mount Lemmon Survey || — || align=right | 2.9 km || 
|-id=821 bgcolor=#E9E9E9
| 479821 ||  || — || December 21, 2008 || Mount Lemmon || Mount Lemmon Survey || — || align=right | 2.0 km || 
|-id=822 bgcolor=#E9E9E9
| 479822 ||  || — || September 11, 2007 || Mount Lemmon || Mount Lemmon Survey || — || align=right | 1.3 km || 
|-id=823 bgcolor=#E9E9E9
| 479823 ||  || — || December 1, 2008 || Mount Lemmon || Mount Lemmon Survey || — || align=right | 3.1 km || 
|-id=824 bgcolor=#fefefe
| 479824 ||  || — || September 4, 2008 || Kitt Peak || Spacewatch || — || align=right data-sort-value="0.97" | 970 m || 
|-id=825 bgcolor=#d6d6d6
| 479825 ||  || — || February 2, 2008 || Catalina || CSS || — || align=right | 3.7 km || 
|-id=826 bgcolor=#d6d6d6
| 479826 ||  || — || September 19, 2006 || Catalina || CSS || — || align=right | 2.7 km || 
|-id=827 bgcolor=#E9E9E9
| 479827 ||  || — || October 30, 2008 || Kitt Peak || Spacewatch || — || align=right | 1.0 km || 
|-id=828 bgcolor=#E9E9E9
| 479828 ||  || — || March 15, 2010 || Kitt Peak || Spacewatch || — || align=right data-sort-value="0.99" | 990 m || 
|-id=829 bgcolor=#d6d6d6
| 479829 ||  || — || January 10, 2013 || Mount Lemmon || Mount Lemmon Survey || NAE || align=right | 2.8 km || 
|-id=830 bgcolor=#d6d6d6
| 479830 ||  || — || June 28, 2010 || WISE || WISE || LIX || align=right | 3.5 km || 
|-id=831 bgcolor=#E9E9E9
| 479831 ||  || — || March 9, 2005 || Mount Lemmon || Mount Lemmon Survey || — || align=right | 2.1 km || 
|-id=832 bgcolor=#E9E9E9
| 479832 ||  || — || September 7, 2008 || Mount Lemmon || Mount Lemmon Survey || (1547) || align=right | 1.6 km || 
|-id=833 bgcolor=#E9E9E9
| 479833 ||  || — || November 26, 2003 || Kitt Peak || Spacewatch || — || align=right | 2.0 km || 
|-id=834 bgcolor=#d6d6d6
| 479834 ||  || — || January 9, 2008 || Mount Lemmon || Mount Lemmon Survey || Tj (2.99) || align=right | 3.3 km || 
|-id=835 bgcolor=#d6d6d6
| 479835 ||  || — || April 2, 2009 || Mount Lemmon || Mount Lemmon Survey || — || align=right | 3.3 km || 
|-id=836 bgcolor=#E9E9E9
| 479836 ||  || — || November 4, 1999 || Kitt Peak || Spacewatch || — || align=right | 1.4 km || 
|-id=837 bgcolor=#E9E9E9
| 479837 ||  || — || October 10, 2007 || Kitt Peak || Spacewatch || — || align=right | 2.0 km || 
|-id=838 bgcolor=#d6d6d6
| 479838 ||  || — || March 19, 2009 || Mount Lemmon || Mount Lemmon Survey || — || align=right | 3.0 km || 
|-id=839 bgcolor=#d6d6d6
| 479839 ||  || — || January 1, 2008 || Kitt Peak || Spacewatch || — || align=right | 2.4 km || 
|-id=840 bgcolor=#d6d6d6
| 479840 ||  || — || September 26, 2011 || Mount Lemmon || Mount Lemmon Survey || — || align=right | 2.3 km || 
|-id=841 bgcolor=#fefefe
| 479841 ||  || — || October 12, 2005 || Kitt Peak || Spacewatch || MAS || align=right data-sort-value="0.67" | 670 m || 
|-id=842 bgcolor=#d6d6d6
| 479842 ||  || — || January 20, 2009 || Mount Lemmon || Mount Lemmon Survey || — || align=right | 2.7 km || 
|-id=843 bgcolor=#E9E9E9
| 479843 ||  || — || September 20, 2003 || Kitt Peak || Spacewatch || — || align=right | 1.9 km || 
|-id=844 bgcolor=#d6d6d6
| 479844 ||  || — || September 29, 2011 || Kitt Peak || Spacewatch || — || align=right | 3.2 km || 
|-id=845 bgcolor=#d6d6d6
| 479845 ||  || — || October 13, 2005 || Kitt Peak || Spacewatch || — || align=right | 3.8 km || 
|-id=846 bgcolor=#E9E9E9
| 479846 ||  || — || November 21, 2008 || Mount Lemmon || Mount Lemmon Survey || (5) || align=right data-sort-value="0.85" | 850 m || 
|-id=847 bgcolor=#d6d6d6
| 479847 ||  || — || March 22, 2009 || Catalina || CSS || — || align=right | 3.0 km || 
|-id=848 bgcolor=#E9E9E9
| 479848 ||  || — || May 28, 2006 || Kitt Peak || Spacewatch || — || align=right | 3.3 km || 
|-id=849 bgcolor=#E9E9E9
| 479849 ||  || — || January 29, 2009 || Mount Lemmon || Mount Lemmon Survey || — || align=right | 2.3 km || 
|-id=850 bgcolor=#d6d6d6
| 479850 ||  || — || March 29, 2004 || Kitt Peak || Spacewatch || — || align=right | 2.7 km || 
|-id=851 bgcolor=#E9E9E9
| 479851 ||  || — || December 22, 2008 || Mount Lemmon || Mount Lemmon Survey || — || align=right | 2.0 km || 
|-id=852 bgcolor=#E9E9E9
| 479852 ||  || — || September 9, 2007 || Mount Lemmon || Mount Lemmon Survey || — || align=right | 1.5 km || 
|-id=853 bgcolor=#E9E9E9
| 479853 ||  || — || May 16, 2005 || Mount Lemmon || Mount Lemmon Survey || DOR || align=right | 2.1 km || 
|-id=854 bgcolor=#d6d6d6
| 479854 ||  || — || April 5, 2008 || Kitt Peak || Spacewatch || — || align=right | 3.4 km || 
|-id=855 bgcolor=#d6d6d6
| 479855 ||  || — || October 11, 2005 || Kitt Peak || Spacewatch || EOS || align=right | 1.7 km || 
|-id=856 bgcolor=#E9E9E9
| 479856 ||  || — || September 15, 2006 || Kitt Peak || Spacewatch || HOF || align=right | 2.3 km || 
|-id=857 bgcolor=#d6d6d6
| 479857 ||  || — || February 18, 2008 || Mount Lemmon || Mount Lemmon Survey || EOS || align=right | 1.8 km || 
|-id=858 bgcolor=#E9E9E9
| 479858 ||  || — || April 21, 1993 || Kitt Peak || Spacewatch || EUN || align=right | 1.1 km || 
|-id=859 bgcolor=#E9E9E9
| 479859 ||  || — || December 3, 2012 || Catalina || CSS || EUN || align=right | 1.4 km || 
|-id=860 bgcolor=#E9E9E9
| 479860 ||  || — || December 30, 2008 || Catalina || CSS || — || align=right | 1.8 km || 
|-id=861 bgcolor=#E9E9E9
| 479861 ||  || — || February 17, 2010 || Kitt Peak || Spacewatch || — || align=right | 1.2 km || 
|-id=862 bgcolor=#E9E9E9
| 479862 ||  || — || November 18, 2007 || Mount Lemmon || Mount Lemmon Survey || AGN || align=right | 1.4 km || 
|-id=863 bgcolor=#E9E9E9
| 479863 ||  || — || February 28, 2009 || Kitt Peak || Spacewatch || AGN || align=right | 1.3 km || 
|-id=864 bgcolor=#E9E9E9
| 479864 ||  || — || April 8, 2010 || Kitt Peak || Spacewatch || — || align=right | 1.8 km || 
|-id=865 bgcolor=#d6d6d6
| 479865 ||  || — || April 19, 2009 || Kitt Peak || Spacewatch || — || align=right | 3.7 km || 
|-id=866 bgcolor=#d6d6d6
| 479866 ||  || — || September 1, 2010 || Mount Lemmon || Mount Lemmon Survey || — || align=right | 2.6 km || 
|-id=867 bgcolor=#E9E9E9
| 479867 ||  || — || January 16, 2004 || Kitt Peak || Spacewatch || — || align=right | 2.5 km || 
|-id=868 bgcolor=#d6d6d6
| 479868 ||  || — || May 4, 2009 || Mount Lemmon || Mount Lemmon Survey || — || align=right | 3.1 km || 
|-id=869 bgcolor=#fefefe
| 479869 ||  || — || October 16, 2012 || Mount Lemmon || Mount Lemmon Survey || — || align=right data-sort-value="0.70" | 700 m || 
|-id=870 bgcolor=#d6d6d6
| 479870 ||  || — || November 17, 2011 || Mount Lemmon || Mount Lemmon Survey || — || align=right | 2.8 km || 
|-id=871 bgcolor=#d6d6d6
| 479871 ||  || — || December 31, 2007 || Kitt Peak || Spacewatch || — || align=right | 2.4 km || 
|-id=872 bgcolor=#d6d6d6
| 479872 ||  || — || September 29, 2005 || Kitt Peak || Spacewatch || — || align=right | 2.7 km || 
|-id=873 bgcolor=#E9E9E9
| 479873 ||  || — || November 20, 2003 || Socorro || LINEAR || — || align=right | 2.4 km || 
|-id=874 bgcolor=#E9E9E9
| 479874 ||  || — || November 18, 2003 || Kitt Peak || Spacewatch || — || align=right | 1.5 km || 
|-id=875 bgcolor=#E9E9E9
| 479875 ||  || — || February 19, 2001 || Anderson Mesa || LONEOS || — || align=right | 1.4 km || 
|-id=876 bgcolor=#d6d6d6
| 479876 ||  || — || March 27, 2009 || Catalina || CSS || BRA || align=right | 1.6 km || 
|-id=877 bgcolor=#d6d6d6
| 479877 ||  || — || November 5, 2005 || Anderson Mesa || LONEOS || — || align=right | 4.6 km || 
|-id=878 bgcolor=#E9E9E9
| 479878 ||  || — || April 16, 2005 || Kitt Peak || Spacewatch || — || align=right | 2.0 km || 
|-id=879 bgcolor=#d6d6d6
| 479879 ||  || — || March 11, 2003 || Kitt Peak || Spacewatch || — || align=right | 3.3 km || 
|-id=880 bgcolor=#d6d6d6
| 479880 ||  || — || October 28, 2006 || Mount Lemmon || Mount Lemmon Survey || — || align=right | 2.4 km || 
|-id=881 bgcolor=#d6d6d6
| 479881 ||  || — || June 21, 2010 || WISE || WISE || — || align=right | 3.1 km || 
|-id=882 bgcolor=#E9E9E9
| 479882 ||  || — || March 8, 2005 || Kitt Peak || Spacewatch || JUN || align=right data-sort-value="0.93" | 930 m || 
|-id=883 bgcolor=#d6d6d6
| 479883 ||  || — || September 26, 1995 || Kitt Peak || Spacewatch || — || align=right | 2.6 km || 
|-id=884 bgcolor=#d6d6d6
| 479884 ||  || — || February 9, 2008 || Kitt Peak || Spacewatch || — || align=right | 2.3 km || 
|-id=885 bgcolor=#d6d6d6
| 479885 ||  || — || April 21, 2009 || Kitt Peak || Spacewatch || — || align=right | 3.1 km || 
|-id=886 bgcolor=#d6d6d6
| 479886 ||  || — || November 3, 2011 || Kitt Peak || Spacewatch || — || align=right | 2.7 km || 
|-id=887 bgcolor=#d6d6d6
| 479887 ||  || — || April 20, 2004 || Kitt Peak || Spacewatch || — || align=right | 1.9 km || 
|-id=888 bgcolor=#E9E9E9
| 479888 ||  || — || February 2, 2009 || Mount Lemmon || Mount Lemmon Survey || — || align=right | 1.3 km || 
|-id=889 bgcolor=#d6d6d6
| 479889 ||  || — || February 13, 2008 || Mount Lemmon || Mount Lemmon Survey || — || align=right | 2.5 km || 
|-id=890 bgcolor=#d6d6d6
| 479890 ||  || — || March 3, 2008 || XuYi || PMO NEO || — || align=right | 3.2 km || 
|-id=891 bgcolor=#E9E9E9
| 479891 ||  || — || April 1, 2005 || Kitt Peak || Spacewatch || — || align=right | 2.0 km || 
|-id=892 bgcolor=#E9E9E9
| 479892 ||  || — || November 1, 2007 || Mount Lemmon || Mount Lemmon Survey || — || align=right | 1.6 km || 
|-id=893 bgcolor=#d6d6d6
| 479893 ||  || — || October 1, 2011 || Kitt Peak || Spacewatch || — || align=right | 2.4 km || 
|-id=894 bgcolor=#d6d6d6
| 479894 ||  || — || November 1, 2005 || Kitt Peak || Spacewatch || — || align=right | 3.0 km || 
|-id=895 bgcolor=#fefefe
| 479895 ||  || — || January 27, 2006 || Catalina || CSS || — || align=right | 1.1 km || 
|-id=896 bgcolor=#d6d6d6
| 479896 ||  || — || May 15, 2009 || Kitt Peak || Spacewatch || — || align=right | 2.9 km || 
|-id=897 bgcolor=#E9E9E9
| 479897 ||  || — || November 2, 2008 || Mount Lemmon || Mount Lemmon Survey || — || align=right | 2.3 km || 
|-id=898 bgcolor=#d6d6d6
| 479898 ||  || — || June 28, 2010 || WISE || WISE || — || align=right | 2.7 km || 
|-id=899 bgcolor=#E9E9E9
| 479899 ||  || — || March 21, 2009 || Catalina || CSS || NEM || align=right | 2.5 km || 
|-id=900 bgcolor=#d6d6d6
| 479900 ||  || — || September 10, 2004 || Kitt Peak || Spacewatch || — || align=right | 3.0 km || 
|}

479901–480000 

|-bgcolor=#d6d6d6
| 479901 ||  || — || January 15, 2008 || Mount Lemmon || Mount Lemmon Survey || — || align=right | 2.2 km || 
|-id=902 bgcolor=#d6d6d6
| 479902 ||  || — || April 22, 2009 || Mount Lemmon || Mount Lemmon Survey || — || align=right | 2.7 km || 
|-id=903 bgcolor=#d6d6d6
| 479903 ||  || — || October 23, 2011 || Mount Lemmon || Mount Lemmon Survey || EOS || align=right | 1.5 km || 
|-id=904 bgcolor=#E9E9E9
| 479904 ||  || — || November 8, 2007 || Kitt Peak || Spacewatch || — || align=right | 2.0 km || 
|-id=905 bgcolor=#E9E9E9
| 479905 ||  || — || October 20, 1995 || Kitt Peak || Spacewatch || MAR || align=right | 1.1 km || 
|-id=906 bgcolor=#E9E9E9
| 479906 ||  || — || October 10, 2007 || Mount Lemmon || Mount Lemmon Survey || — || align=right | 2.0 km || 
|-id=907 bgcolor=#d6d6d6
| 479907 ||  || — || December 31, 2007 || Mount Lemmon || Mount Lemmon Survey || — || align=right | 2.3 km || 
|-id=908 bgcolor=#E9E9E9
| 479908 ||  || — || April 10, 2005 || Kitt Peak || Spacewatch || — || align=right | 2.1 km || 
|-id=909 bgcolor=#d6d6d6
| 479909 ||  || — || November 4, 2005 || Catalina || CSS || VER || align=right | 4.8 km || 
|-id=910 bgcolor=#d6d6d6
| 479910 ||  || — || October 27, 2005 || Kitt Peak || Spacewatch || — || align=right | 2.9 km || 
|-id=911 bgcolor=#d6d6d6
| 479911 ||  || — || March 19, 2009 || Mount Lemmon || Mount Lemmon Survey || — || align=right | 2.7 km || 
|-id=912 bgcolor=#d6d6d6
| 479912 ||  || — || March 23, 2006 || Kitt Peak || Spacewatch || 3:2 || align=right | 5.1 km || 
|-id=913 bgcolor=#E9E9E9
| 479913 ||  || — || October 20, 2011 || Mount Lemmon || Mount Lemmon Survey || AGN || align=right | 1.00 km || 
|-id=914 bgcolor=#E9E9E9
| 479914 ||  || — || October 7, 2007 || Mount Lemmon || Mount Lemmon Survey || — || align=right | 1.8 km || 
|-id=915 bgcolor=#d6d6d6
| 479915 ||  || — || January 15, 2013 || Catalina || CSS || — || align=right | 2.7 km || 
|-id=916 bgcolor=#d6d6d6
| 479916 ||  || — || June 18, 2010 || WISE || WISE || — || align=right | 3.3 km || 
|-id=917 bgcolor=#d6d6d6
| 479917 ||  || — || March 10, 2008 || Kitt Peak || Spacewatch || — || align=right | 2.8 km || 
|-id=918 bgcolor=#E9E9E9
| 479918 ||  || — || April 8, 2010 || Kitt Peak || Spacewatch || — || align=right data-sort-value="0.92" | 920 m || 
|-id=919 bgcolor=#d6d6d6
| 479919 ||  || — || October 20, 2011 || Mount Lemmon || Mount Lemmon Survey || — || align=right | 2.8 km || 
|-id=920 bgcolor=#E9E9E9
| 479920 ||  || — || November 8, 2007 || Mount Lemmon || Mount Lemmon Survey || — || align=right | 2.0 km || 
|-id=921 bgcolor=#d6d6d6
| 479921 ||  || — || March 6, 2008 || Mount Lemmon || Mount Lemmon Survey || — || align=right | 3.1 km || 
|-id=922 bgcolor=#d6d6d6
| 479922 ||  || — || March 5, 2008 || Mount Lemmon || Mount Lemmon Survey || EOS || align=right | 1.4 km || 
|-id=923 bgcolor=#d6d6d6
| 479923 ||  || — || March 31, 2008 || Mount Lemmon || Mount Lemmon Survey || — || align=right | 4.4 km || 
|-id=924 bgcolor=#d6d6d6
| 479924 ||  || — || July 29, 2008 || Kitt Peak || Spacewatch || (3561)3:2 || align=right | 3.8 km || 
|-id=925 bgcolor=#E9E9E9
| 479925 ||  || — || November 2, 2007 || Mount Lemmon || Mount Lemmon Survey || — || align=right | 1.8 km || 
|-id=926 bgcolor=#d6d6d6
| 479926 ||  || — || August 22, 2004 || Kitt Peak || Spacewatch || — || align=right | 3.4 km || 
|-id=927 bgcolor=#d6d6d6
| 479927 ||  || — || December 31, 2007 || Mount Lemmon || Mount Lemmon Survey || — || align=right | 2.4 km || 
|-id=928 bgcolor=#E9E9E9
| 479928 ||  || — || November 17, 2007 || Kitt Peak || Spacewatch || HOF || align=right | 2.0 km || 
|-id=929 bgcolor=#d6d6d6
| 479929 ||  || — || October 16, 2006 || Kitt Peak || Spacewatch || — || align=right | 2.0 km || 
|-id=930 bgcolor=#d6d6d6
| 479930 ||  || — || October 23, 2011 || Kitt Peak || Spacewatch || — || align=right | 3.4 km || 
|-id=931 bgcolor=#d6d6d6
| 479931 ||  || — || September 14, 2005 || Catalina || CSS || — || align=right | 2.8 km || 
|-id=932 bgcolor=#d6d6d6
| 479932 ||  || — || December 4, 2012 || Mount Lemmon || Mount Lemmon Survey || — || align=right | 2.9 km || 
|-id=933 bgcolor=#E9E9E9
| 479933 ||  || — || October 9, 2012 || Mount Lemmon || Mount Lemmon Survey || — || align=right | 1.5 km || 
|-id=934 bgcolor=#E9E9E9
| 479934 ||  || — || February 3, 2001 || Kitt Peak || Spacewatch || — || align=right data-sort-value="0.82" | 820 m || 
|-id=935 bgcolor=#E9E9E9
| 479935 ||  || — || March 3, 2009 || Kitt Peak || Spacewatch || — || align=right | 2.4 km || 
|-id=936 bgcolor=#E9E9E9
| 479936 ||  || — || December 15, 2007 || Kitt Peak || Spacewatch || AGN || align=right | 1.0 km || 
|-id=937 bgcolor=#E9E9E9
| 479937 ||  || — || November 9, 2007 || Kitt Peak || Spacewatch || AGN || align=right | 1.0 km || 
|-id=938 bgcolor=#E9E9E9
| 479938 ||  || — || October 14, 2007 || Mount Lemmon || Mount Lemmon Survey || — || align=right | 2.6 km || 
|-id=939 bgcolor=#d6d6d6
| 479939 ||  || — || September 18, 2006 || Anderson Mesa || LONEOS || KOR || align=right | 1.8 km || 
|-id=940 bgcolor=#d6d6d6
| 479940 ||  || — || December 5, 2007 || Kitt Peak || Spacewatch || KOR || align=right | 1.4 km || 
|-id=941 bgcolor=#d6d6d6
| 479941 ||  || — || October 27, 2005 || Kitt Peak || Spacewatch || VER || align=right | 2.4 km || 
|-id=942 bgcolor=#d6d6d6
| 479942 ||  || — || March 9, 2008 || Mount Lemmon || Mount Lemmon Survey || EOS || align=right | 1.4 km || 
|-id=943 bgcolor=#d6d6d6
| 479943 ||  || — || September 29, 2011 || Kitt Peak || Spacewatch || — || align=right | 2.7 km || 
|-id=944 bgcolor=#d6d6d6
| 479944 ||  || — || October 30, 2011 || Kitt Peak || Spacewatch || VER || align=right | 2.3 km || 
|-id=945 bgcolor=#E9E9E9
| 479945 ||  || — || February 4, 2009 || Catalina || CSS || EUN || align=right | 1.3 km || 
|-id=946 bgcolor=#E9E9E9
| 479946 ||  || — || October 8, 2012 || Kitt Peak || Spacewatch || — || align=right | 1.5 km || 
|-id=947 bgcolor=#d6d6d6
| 479947 ||  || — || June 10, 2010 || WISE || WISE || — || align=right | 3.8 km || 
|-id=948 bgcolor=#d6d6d6
| 479948 ||  || — || October 21, 2011 || Mount Lemmon || Mount Lemmon Survey || — || align=right | 2.9 km || 
|-id=949 bgcolor=#d6d6d6
| 479949 ||  || — || October 20, 2011 || Mount Lemmon || Mount Lemmon Survey || — || align=right | 2.5 km || 
|-id=950 bgcolor=#E9E9E9
| 479950 ||  || — || November 7, 2007 || Kitt Peak || Spacewatch || — || align=right | 1.9 km || 
|-id=951 bgcolor=#E9E9E9
| 479951 ||  || — || September 18, 2003 || Kitt Peak || Spacewatch || EUN || align=right | 1.2 km || 
|-id=952 bgcolor=#E9E9E9
| 479952 ||  || — || February 20, 2009 || Mount Lemmon || Mount Lemmon Survey || — || align=right | 2.0 km || 
|-id=953 bgcolor=#E9E9E9
| 479953 ||  || — || February 2, 2009 || Mount Lemmon || Mount Lemmon Survey || — || align=right | 1.5 km || 
|-id=954 bgcolor=#d6d6d6
| 479954 ||  || — || October 2, 2006 || Mount Lemmon || Mount Lemmon Survey || — || align=right | 2.6 km || 
|-id=955 bgcolor=#E9E9E9
| 479955 ||  || — || October 19, 2007 || Catalina || CSS || — || align=right | 2.6 km || 
|-id=956 bgcolor=#d6d6d6
| 479956 ||  || — || May 21, 2010 || WISE || WISE || — || align=right | 2.6 km || 
|-id=957 bgcolor=#d6d6d6
| 479957 ||  || — || November 22, 2005 || Kitt Peak || Spacewatch || Tj (2.98) || align=right | 4.0 km || 
|-id=958 bgcolor=#d6d6d6
| 479958 ||  || — || October 31, 2005 || Mount Lemmon || Mount Lemmon Survey || — || align=right | 3.9 km || 
|-id=959 bgcolor=#d6d6d6
| 479959 ||  || — || September 14, 2010 || Mount Lemmon || Mount Lemmon Survey || — || align=right | 2.9 km || 
|-id=960 bgcolor=#d6d6d6
| 479960 ||  || — || November 18, 2011 || Kitt Peak || Spacewatch || — || align=right | 3.0 km || 
|-id=961 bgcolor=#d6d6d6
| 479961 ||  || — || November 1, 2011 || Mount Lemmon || Mount Lemmon Survey || — || align=right | 3.0 km || 
|-id=962 bgcolor=#d6d6d6
| 479962 ||  || — || June 10, 2010 || WISE || WISE || EOS || align=right | 2.8 km || 
|-id=963 bgcolor=#d6d6d6
| 479963 ||  || — || November 16, 2006 || Mount Lemmon || Mount Lemmon Survey || — || align=right | 2.7 km || 
|-id=964 bgcolor=#E9E9E9
| 479964 ||  || — || January 30, 2009 || Catalina || CSS || — || align=right | 1.00 km || 
|-id=965 bgcolor=#d6d6d6
| 479965 ||  || — || April 8, 2003 || Kitt Peak || Spacewatch || — || align=right | 4.1 km || 
|-id=966 bgcolor=#d6d6d6
| 479966 ||  || — || December 1, 2006 || Mount Lemmon || Mount Lemmon Survey || — || align=right | 4.6 km || 
|-id=967 bgcolor=#d6d6d6
| 479967 ||  || — || April 2, 2009 || Mount Lemmon || Mount Lemmon Survey || BRA || align=right | 1.5 km || 
|-id=968 bgcolor=#d6d6d6
| 479968 ||  || — || November 4, 2005 || Kitt Peak || Spacewatch || — || align=right | 3.0 km || 
|-id=969 bgcolor=#E9E9E9
| 479969 ||  || — || April 24, 2000 || Kitt Peak || Spacewatch || — || align=right | 2.4 km || 
|-id=970 bgcolor=#d6d6d6
| 479970 ||  || — || January 17, 2013 || Mount Lemmon || Mount Lemmon Survey || — || align=right | 2.7 km || 
|-id=971 bgcolor=#d6d6d6
| 479971 ||  || — || May 17, 2009 || Mount Lemmon || Mount Lemmon Survey || EOS || align=right | 1.5 km || 
|-id=972 bgcolor=#d6d6d6
| 479972 ||  || — || April 28, 2008 || Kitt Peak || Spacewatch || — || align=right | 2.9 km || 
|-id=973 bgcolor=#E9E9E9
| 479973 ||  || — || June 15, 2010 || Mount Lemmon || Mount Lemmon Survey || — || align=right | 1.3 km || 
|-id=974 bgcolor=#d6d6d6
| 479974 ||  || — || April 1, 2008 || Kitt Peak || Spacewatch || ELF || align=right | 3.0 km || 
|-id=975 bgcolor=#d6d6d6
| 479975 ||  || — || April 10, 2008 || Catalina || CSS || — || align=right | 4.3 km || 
|-id=976 bgcolor=#d6d6d6
| 479976 ||  || — || April 19, 2009 || Mount Lemmon || Mount Lemmon Survey || — || align=right | 2.3 km || 
|-id=977 bgcolor=#d6d6d6
| 479977 ||  || — || February 12, 2008 || Mount Lemmon || Mount Lemmon Survey || HYG || align=right | 2.3 km || 
|-id=978 bgcolor=#d6d6d6
| 479978 ||  || — || September 30, 2005 || Mount Lemmon || Mount Lemmon Survey || — || align=right | 3.1 km || 
|-id=979 bgcolor=#d6d6d6
| 479979 ||  || — || June 25, 2010 || WISE || WISE || — || align=right | 4.2 km || 
|-id=980 bgcolor=#d6d6d6
| 479980 ||  || — || February 9, 2008 || Mount Lemmon || Mount Lemmon Survey || — || align=right | 2.9 km || 
|-id=981 bgcolor=#d6d6d6
| 479981 ||  || — || May 3, 2014 || Mount Lemmon || Mount Lemmon Survey || — || align=right | 2.9 km || 
|-id=982 bgcolor=#d6d6d6
| 479982 ||  || — || November 2, 2011 || Kitt Peak || Spacewatch || EOS || align=right | 1.6 km || 
|-id=983 bgcolor=#E9E9E9
| 479983 ||  || — || December 4, 2012 || Mount Lemmon || Mount Lemmon Survey || EUN || align=right | 1.3 km || 
|-id=984 bgcolor=#E9E9E9
| 479984 ||  || — || February 14, 2004 || Kitt Peak || Spacewatch || — || align=right | 2.4 km || 
|-id=985 bgcolor=#E9E9E9
| 479985 ||  || — || September 15, 2007 || Mount Lemmon || Mount Lemmon Survey || — || align=right | 2.4 km || 
|-id=986 bgcolor=#E9E9E9
| 479986 ||  || — || December 11, 2012 || Mount Lemmon || Mount Lemmon Survey || ADE || align=right | 2.2 km || 
|-id=987 bgcolor=#d6d6d6
| 479987 ||  || — || March 29, 2008 || Catalina || CSS || — || align=right | 4.0 km || 
|-id=988 bgcolor=#E9E9E9
| 479988 ||  || — || November 4, 2007 || Mount Lemmon || Mount Lemmon Survey || — || align=right | 2.9 km || 
|-id=989 bgcolor=#E9E9E9
| 479989 ||  || — || October 27, 2012 || Mount Lemmon || Mount Lemmon Survey || — || align=right data-sort-value="0.80" | 800 m || 
|-id=990 bgcolor=#E9E9E9
| 479990 ||  || — || March 19, 2009 || Mount Lemmon || Mount Lemmon Survey || MRX || align=right | 1.0 km || 
|-id=991 bgcolor=#d6d6d6
| 479991 ||  || — || October 13, 2006 || Kitt Peak || Spacewatch || EOS || align=right | 1.8 km || 
|-id=992 bgcolor=#E9E9E9
| 479992 ||  || — || January 17, 2009 || Kitt Peak || Spacewatch || — || align=right | 2.2 km || 
|-id=993 bgcolor=#E9E9E9
| 479993 ||  || — || October 10, 2007 || Mount Lemmon || Mount Lemmon Survey || — || align=right | 2.2 km || 
|-id=994 bgcolor=#d6d6d6
| 479994 ||  || — || October 1, 2010 || Mount Lemmon || Mount Lemmon Survey || — || align=right | 2.4 km || 
|-id=995 bgcolor=#d6d6d6
| 479995 ||  || — || October 27, 2005 || Mount Lemmon || Mount Lemmon Survey || — || align=right | 3.0 km || 
|-id=996 bgcolor=#d6d6d6
| 479996 ||  || — || November 19, 2006 || Kitt Peak || Spacewatch || EOS || align=right | 2.1 km || 
|-id=997 bgcolor=#d6d6d6
| 479997 ||  || — || October 11, 2005 || Kitt Peak || Spacewatch || — || align=right | 2.4 km || 
|-id=998 bgcolor=#E9E9E9
| 479998 ||  || — || October 16, 2007 || Mount Lemmon || Mount Lemmon Survey || DOR || align=right | 2.6 km || 
|-id=999 bgcolor=#d6d6d6
| 479999 ||  || — || December 5, 2005 || Mount Lemmon || Mount Lemmon Survey || — || align=right | 3.5 km || 
|-id=000 bgcolor=#d6d6d6
| 480000 ||  || — || March 5, 2013 || Catalina || CSS || EOS || align=right | 2.3 km || 
|}

References

External links 
 Discovery Circumstances: Numbered Minor Planets (475001)–(480000) (IAU Minor Planet Center)

0479